= Phlebotomy licensure in the United States =

Phlebotomy licensure in the United States is the process by which various regulatory bodies regulate the practice of phlebotomy through licensure. There are no federal phlebotomy training or certification requirements, though several states have imposed their own requirements. In 2024, four states require licensure for phlebotomy: California, Louisiana, Nevada, and Washington.

In 2001, California enacted phlebotomy licensure after an on-the-job trained phlebotomist was found to be re-using needles. Following California, several states including Massachusetts and Missouri attempted to introduce either licensure or training/educational requirements, but the bills died.

Phlebotomy licensure advocates claim that the licensure would enhance the quality of personnel, while the laboratory industry opposes phlebotomy licensure as an unnecessary cost. Phlebotomy is not without risk, and more challenging patients increase the chance of complications. However, without licensure, it can be difficult to hold bad actors accountable. Nonphysician healthcare personnel, including phlebotomists, may be sued due to poor practice standards.

Increasingly, a number of healthcare facilities are rolling phlebotomy duties into their patient care technician roles or other allied health roles.

A number of FDA 510k cleared devices, such as the BD Minidraw have been introduced to enable the drawing of blood without a phlebotomist. Additionally, there are devices to help aid non-phlebotomists more readily find veins.

== Certifications ==
There are several national phlebotomy certifications in the US.

List of Phlebotomy Certifications in the United States
| Abbr | Phlebotomy Certifying Agency | Certification | Designation | Notes |
|---|---|---|---|---|
| AAH | American Allied Health | Certified Phlebotomy Technician | CPT (AAH) | |
| ACA | American Certification Agency for Healthcare Professionals | Certified Phlebotomy Technician | CPT(ACA) | |
| AECA | American Education Certification Association | Certified Phlebotomy Technician Specialist | CPTS (AECA) | |
| AMCA | American Medical Certification Association | | PTC (AMCA) | |
| AMT | American Medical Technologists | Register Phlebotomy Technician | RPT(AMT) | |
| ASCP | American Society for Clinical Pathology | Phlebotomy Technician | PBT(ASCP) | |
| ASPT | American Society of Phlebotomy Technicians | Certified Phlebotomy Technician | CPT(ASPT) | |
| IAPA | International Academy of Phlebotomy Sciences | | | |
| NCA | National Credentialing Agency for Laboratory Personnel | | CLPlb(NCA) | |
| NCCT/MMCI | National Center for Competency Testing | National Certified Phlebotomy Technician | NCPT(NCCT) | |
| NHA | National Healthcareer Association | Certified Phlebotomy Technician | CPT(NHA) | |
| NAHP | National Association for Health Professionals | National Registered Certified Phlebotomy Technician | NRCPT(NAHP) | |
| NPA | National Phlebotomy Association | Certified Phlebotomy Technician | CPT(NPA) | |
| NPCE | National Phlebotomy Certification Examination | Phlebotomy Technician | | |
| NPS | National Performance Specialist | Certified Phlebotomy Technician | | |

== States ==
=== California ===
In 2001, California enacted phlebotomy licensure following a public health outcry about an on-the-job trained phlebotomist that re-used needles.

California has two levels of phlebotomy licensure:

- Certified Phlebotomy Technician I (CPT I) – authorized to perform skin puncture and venipuncture blood collection.
- Certified Phlebotomy Technician II (CPT II) – authorized to perform skin puncture, venipuncture, and arterial puncture blood collection.

California introduced phlebotomy licensure after an on-the-job trained phlebotomist at a Palo Alto phlebotomy draw station for SmithKline Beecham Clinical Laboratory (SBCL) was found to be re-using needles, sometimes after washing them with diluted hydrogen peroxide, in an effort to save supplies and run a cost-efficient lab. The phlebotomist was also accused of mislabeling blood to cover-up mistakes, of reusing the same pipette for both blood and urine samples and of rarely wearing rubber gloves while working. The laboratory conducted an internal review of its phlebotomy practices at its 800 sites across the United States and found no deficiencies. The California Department of Public Health (CDPH) advised the approximately 3600 impacted patients whom had their blood drawn at the clinic to get HIV and Hepatitis testing as well as counseling. A subsequent study found a low risk of infection from the re-used needles due to the low infection prevalence in Palo Alto.

=== Connecticut ===
In 2005, a bill was introduced requiring 80 hours of training and certification of phlebotomists, but was not passed.

=== District of Columbia ===
In 2014, DC passed Law 20-272, Clinical Laboratory Practitioners Amendment Act of 2014 which established a registration board for phlebotomists.

=== Illinois ===
Phlebotomists are not licensed in Illinois but must have a high school diploma and have completed a training program to practice. Certification is not required and phlebotomists do not fall under the Illinois Clinical Laboratory Act.

In 2020, Illinois passed a bill requiring the Illinois Department of Public Health to triannually develop training materials for drawing blood from children and adults with intellectual and developmental disabilities and for facilities to ensure the training is incorporated for phlebotomists.

There have been bills to introduce phlebotomy licensure in Illinois, but have been unsuccessful.

=== Kentucky ===
In 2005, a bill was introduced that would require 80 hours of didactic and practical training, plus 50 hours of clinical training, and certification as a phlebotomy technician for phlebotomy, that did not pass.

=== Massachusetts ===
In 2007, a bill (HR 312) was introduced to establish a board of registration of phlebotomists, but did not pass.

=== Missouri ===
In 2008, a bill to license medical technologists and phlebotomists was introduced, but did not pass.

=== North Carolina ===
North Carolina does not have any additional state requirements for phlebotomy.

=== West Virginia ===
In 1999, a bill was introduced that would require phlebotomists be certified, but it died in committee.
