= National Accrediting Agency for Clinical Laboratory Sciences =

US educational accreditation organization

National Accrediting Agency for Clinical Laboratory Sciences (NAACLS) is a US based educational accreditation organization that accredits clinical laboratory educational programs. NAACLS is accredited by the Council for Higher Education Accreditation (CHEA).

NAACLS is the primary accrediting body for clinical laboratory programs in the US, though the Accrediting Bureau of Health Education Schools(ABHES) also accredits a handful of programs. Graduates of the ABHES are not eligible for the American Society for Clinical Pathology(ASCP) certification, but are eligible for the American Medical Technologists(AMT) certification.

NAACLS has criticized the rise of non-accredited, on-the-job training (OJT) programs as undermining the laboratory profession.

== History ==
It was founded in 1973, after the United States Department of Education pressured the American Society for Clinical Pathology(ASCP) to disband their Board of Schools (BOS) following monopolization concerns. At the time of its founding, there were seven categories of laboratory personnel: Clinical Laboratory Assistant (CLA), Medical Laboratory Technician (MLT), Medical Technologist (MT), Cytotechnologist (CT), and Histotechnologist (HT).

In 2023, there was an effort to standardize program nomenclature which did not pass.

== Programs ==
Name	Abbr.	No. of programs in 2023	Notes
Cytogentic Technologist	CT	2	
Diagnostic Molecular Scientist	DMS	8	
Histotechnician	HT	38	
Histotechnologist	HTL	10	
Medical Laboratory Assistant	MLA	0	
Medical Laboratory Microbiologist	MLM		
Medical Laboratory Scientist	MLS	247	Formerly Medical Technology (MT), then Clinical Laboratory Science (CLS)
Medical Laboratory Technician	MLT	237	
Pathologists' Assistant	PATH A	16	
Phlebotomy	PHLEB	50	
Public Health Microbiologist	PHM		
Doctorate In Clinical Laboratory	DCLS	3	
Biomedical Scientist	BMS	NA	In progress

Decreases in laboratory reimbursement have led to a decline in the number of NAACLS accredited MLS programs from ~700 in 1975 to ~240 programs in 2002, where it has held since.

NAACLS program graduates are eligible to sit for American Society for Clinical Pathology(ASCP) certifications.

== Stance on non-accredited training programs ==
NAACLS has criticized the rise of non-accredited, on-the-job training (OJT) programs as undermining the laboratory profession.

How are laboratory managers responding to the need for graduates from accredited programs to fill their open positions? By hiring people with an undergraduate degree in a science (usually Biology, Chemistry, or Biochemistry) and training them on-the-job if they can, avoiding the accreditation process entirely as well as the certification of the individual. This ‘shortcut’ takes the laboratory scientist’s educational background right back to where we started in the 1920s! I see several threats to our accredited educational programs and, quite frankly, our profession if hiring non-educated, non-certified personnel continues...Devaluing accreditation has devastating consequences for our profession. If the clinical laboratories don’t require certification of their employees, we lose a subset of our target applicants resulting in decreased admissions and likely closure of accredited programs. More importantly, an increase in laboratory workers who are not properly educated dilutes our profession and professional identity, damaging our healthcare system....The downstream effects of this quick fix are widespread. We haven’t addressed how it affects those individuals in the long term. Likely, they will be trained only for their particular environment, which limits their upward mobility, especially if they leave the lab they were trained in. If future laboratory employees (we cannot call them professionals anymore) are those who are trained on the job to perform tests only in one specific laboratory, we have lost everything we have worked for in building and defining our profession and scope of practice over the last 100 years.

— Dr. Maribeth Flaws, NAACLS Board of Directors President, Educational Programs: Threats and Opportunities, NAACLS Annual Report, 2023
