= Phlebotomy licensure =

Phlebotomy licensure is the process by which various regulatory bodies regulate the practice of phlebotomy within its jurisdiction through licensure. In many countries a license is not required, or is obtained through other broader qualifications (such as a medical license), while in others, professional phlebotomists are separately licensed.

In most countries, there is not a dedicated a profession to phlebotomy, but it falls under the responsibility of other allied health professions such as nursing.

== Asia ==
=== China ===
In China, there are no national phlebotomy regulations, and phlebotomy is primarily performed by nurses, though Chinese nursing education offers limited training in phlebotomy quality control.

== Europe ==
=== United Kingdom ===
Phlebotomists need not be licensed in the UK, but training can be provided on-the-job, sometimes with the support of the National Association of Phlebotomists. The skills required may also be monitored through broader monitoring requirements, such as the licence to practice of the General Medical Council.

== North America ==
=== United States ===
In the United States there are no federal phlebotomy training or certification requirements, though several states have imposed their own requirements. In 2024, four states require licensure for phlebotomy: California, Louisiana, Nevada, and Washington.

In 2001, California enacted phlebotomy licensure after an on-the-job trained phlebotomist was found to be re-using needles. Following California, several states including Massachusetts and Missouri attempted to introduce either licensure or training/educational requirements, but the bills died.

Phlebotomy licensure advocates claim that the licensure would enhance the quality of personnel, while the laboratory industry opposes phlebotomy licensure as an unnecessary cost.

Phlebotomy is not without risk, and more challenging patients increase the chance of complications. However, without licensure, it can be difficult to hold bad actors accountable.

Increasingly, a number of healthcare facilities are rolling phlebotomy duties into their patient care technician roles or other allied health roles.

A number of FDA 510k cleared devices, such as the BD Minidraw have been introduced to enable the drawing of blood without a phlebotomist. Additionally, there are devices to help aid non-phlebotomists more readily find veins.

==== Certifications ====
There are several national phlebotomy certifications in the US.

List of Phlebotomy Certifications in the United States
Abbr	Phlebotomy Certifying Agency	Certification	Designation	Notes
AAH	American Allied Health	Certified Phlebotomy Technician	CPT (AAH)	
ACA	American Certification Agency for Healthcare Professionals	Certified Phlebotomy Technician	CPT(ACA)	
AMCA	American Medical Certification Association		PTC (AMCA)	
AMT	American Medical Technologists	Register Phlebotomy Technician	RPT(AMT)	
ASCP	American Society for Clinical Pathology	Phlebotomy Technician	PBT(ASCP)	
ASPT	American Society of Phlebotomy Technicians	Certified Phlebotomy Technician	CPT(ASPT)	
IAPA				
NCA	National Credentialing Agency for Laboratory Personnel		CLPlb(NCA)	
NCCT/MMCI	National Center for Competency Testing	National Certified Phlebotomy Technician	NCPT(NCCT)	
NHA	National Healthcareer Association	Certified Phlebotomy Technician	CPT(NHA)	
NAHP	National Association for Health Professionals	National Registered Certified Phlebotomy Technician	NRCPT(NAHP)	
NPA	National Phlebotomy Association	Certified Phlebotomy Technician	CPT(NPA)	
