= Inhorn =

Inhorn is a surname. Notable people with the surname include:

- Marcia C. Inhorn (born 1957), American medical anthropologist, daughter of Stanley
- Stanley Inhorn (1928–2025), American pathologist
