= ASCT =

ASCT may refer to:

- Agitated saline contrast test, which goes to Contrast-enhanced ultrasound
- American Society for Cytotechnology
- Autologous stem cell transplantation
- Allogeneic stem cell transplantation
