= Marius Audier =

French physician

Marius Audier (1905 - 1991) was a French physician and academic who helped introduced phlebotomy in Europe.

In 1939, after having studied at the Lycée Thiers in Marseille, Marius was appointed agrégé. In the early 1950s, he was actively involved in the implementation of Phlebology in France and Europe. In 1960, Marius was appointed Professeur de Clinique. Later he became the holder of the Chair of Cardiology at the Faculty of Medicine of Marseille.

In 1975, Marius retired. He died in 1991.

== Selected works ==
- La pratique des médications cardio-vasculaires, Paris, G. Doin & cie, 1944;
- Guide du stagiaire en médecine, Paris: Doin, 1965;
- La vie du cardiaque, Paris: Hachette, 1968;
- L'Homme total : nouvel humanisme et humanisme médical, Saint-Maximin : le Temps parallèle, 1986;
- Vieillir jeune : pourquoi? comment?, Marseille: Temps parallèle, 1989;
- Savoir vieillir en restant jeune, Marseille : Autres temps, 1994.

== Legacy ==
In 1981, Marius founded the Institute for Social Gerontology (Institut de Gérontologie Sociale), promoting healthy aging for seniors, addressing to the inhabitants of the city of Marseille, the department of Bouches du Rhone and the PACA region. Solidarity and collective responsibility are required. The approach goes beyond detection and management of health problems, but attempts to energize the elderly, to fight against isolation and loneliness, against the limitations to autonomy and the entry into addiction, or feelings of worthlessness and social rejection associated with the accumulation of poverty and age.

== See also ==
Lycee Thiers,
