= Human Biology (book) =

1993 biology textbook

- Language: English
- Subject: Biology
- Genre: Textbook
- Publisher: Jones & Bartlett Learning
- Publication date: 1993

Human Biology is a basic biology textbook published in 1993 by Jones & Bartlett Learning. It has been recognized as a "good introductory text" for students without a strong scientific background.
