= Endemic Goiter =

1954 non-fiction book

Endemic Goiter: The Adaptation of Man to Iodine Deficiency
- Title page for Endemic Goiter: The Adaptation of Man to Iodine Deficiency (1954)
- Author: John B. Stanbury, Gordon L. Brownell, Douglas S. Riggs, Hector Perinetti, Juan Itoiz and Enrique B. Del Castillo
- Publisher: Harvard University Press
- Publication date: 1954

Endemic Goiter: The Adaptation of Man to Iodine Deficiency is a monograph about a study of endemic goiters conducted in Mendoza Province, Argentina by the Massachusetts General Hospital and the University of Cuyo. Written by John B. Stanbury, Gordon L. Brownell, Douglas S. Riggs, Hector Perinetti, Juan Itoiz and Enrique B. Del Castillo, it was published in 1954 by Harvard University Press as part of their Harvard University Monographs in Medicine and Public Health series. The study itself was conducted just before the addition of iodine was made mandatory in Mendoza, and it suggested that a thyroid deprived of iodine absorbed iodide in blood more quickly than their iodine-satiated counterparts.

Contemporaneous reviews in The Quarterly Review of Biology, Archives of Internal Medicine, Science, and the American Journal of Clinical Pathology all praised the book for what they felt was clear, well-articulated research on the part of the authors. The reviews also felt that the work had provided a great deal of knowledge on thyroids, and several recommended it to wider audience, or just endocrinologists. The Journal of the American Medical Association differed in its assessment, feeling that the book was "too complex and theoretical" for general practitioners, though recommended it for specialists.
