= Carey-Ann Burnham =

American microbiologist

- Citizenship: Canadian, American
- Education: University of Alberta (B.Sc., 2002, Ph.D., 2007)
- Known for: Pathogen identification
- Scientific career
- Fields: Pathology & Immunology, Clinical Microbiology, Medicine
- Workplaces: Washington University in St. Louis; Barnes-Jewish Hospital

Carey-Ann Burnham is a clinical microbiologist, and a professor of Pathology and Immunology, Molecular Microbiology, Pediatrics and Medicine in Washington University School of Medicine. She is an elected fellow of the American Society for Microbiology.

== Education ==
Burnham earned her Ph.D. in medical sciences at the University of Alberta in 2007. Later, she pursued fellowship training in clinical microbiology at Washington University in St. Louis, which she completed in 2009.

== Career ==
Burnham is a professor of Pathology and Immunology, Molecular Microbiology, Pediatrics and Medicine at Washington University. She is the medical director for the clinical microbiology laboratory at Barnes-Jewish Hospital and the program director for the CPEP fellowship at Washington University.

== Research ==
Burnham's research is focused on rapid pathogen identification and antibiotic susceptibility testing to prevent infectious diseases. Burnham edited the Journal of Clinical Microbiology, the Clinical Microbiology Newsletter, Clinics in Laboratory Medicine, and the Manual of Clinical Microbiology. She is the co-editor of the textbook The Dark Art of Blood Cultures, which received praise in the Journal of Clinical Microbiology, where Stephen M. Brecher called the work, "a wonderful historical perspective of the past, present, and future of blood cultures." She has had her work on the topic of diagnostic and clinical microbiology published over two hundred times.

== Memberships ==
Burnham has held senior positions and leadership roles in several professional organizations, including the American Society for Microbiology, Clinical and Laboratory Standards Institute, the American Society for Microbiology, and the Academy of Clinical Laboratory Physicians and Scientists.

== Awards and honors ==
- 2018 Elected fellow of the American Academy of Microbiology
- 2020 American Society for Microbiology Award for Research and Leadership in Clinical Microbiology
- Academy of Clinical Laboratory Physicians and Scientists Ellis S. Benson Award
- "40 Under 40" honoree by the American Society for Clinical Pathology

== Selected publications ==
- Self, Wesley H.; et al. (2021). "Comparative Effectiveness of Moderna, Pfizer-BioNTech, and Janssen (Johnson & Johnson) Vaccines in Preventing COVID-19 Hospitalizations Among Adults Without Immunocompromising Conditions — United States, March–August 2021". MMWR. Morbidity and Mortality Weekly Report. 70 (38): 1337–1343. doi:10.15585/mmwr.mm7038e1. PMC 8459899. PMID 34555004.
- Chavez, Miguel A.; Munigala, Satish; Burnham, Carey-Ann D.; Yarbrough, Melanie L.; Warren, David K. (2022). "The Impact of Implementing the Virtuo Blood Culture System on the Characteristics and Management of Patients with Staphylococcus aureus Bacteremia". Journal of Clinical Microbiology. 60 (4): e0226121. doi:10.1128/jcm.02261-21. PMC 9020342. PMID 35291804. S2CID 247453747.
- Van Belkum, Alex; Burnham, Carey-Ann D.; Rossen, John W. A.; Mallard, Frederic; Rochas, Olivier; Dunne, William Michael (2020). "Innovative and rapid antimicrobial susceptibility testing systems". Nature Reviews Microbiology. 18 (5): 299–311. doi:10.1038/s41579-020-0327-x. hdl:11370/e55ed8f6-6271-4eae-9c45-fc6119f1c851. PMID 32055026. S2CID 211102608.
- Tahan, Stephen; Parikh, Bijal A.; Droit, Lindsay; Wallace, Meghan A.; Burnham, Carey-Ann D.; Wang, David (2021). "SARS-CoV-2 e Gene Variant Alters Analytical Sensitivity Characteristics of Viral Detection Using a Commercial Reverse Transcription-PCR Assay". Journal of Clinical Microbiology. 59 (7): e0007521. doi:10.1128/JCM.00075-21. PMC 8218754. PMID 33903167.
