= Ellinor Peerschke =

German-American biologist and researcher (1954–2023)

- Born: 1954; Braunschweig, West Germany
- Died: 2023 (aged 68–69)

Academic background
- Education: Rutgers University; New York University

Ellinor Peerschke (May 7, 1954 – October 13, 2023) was an American scientist specializing in coagulation, complement, and platelet biology.

== Early life and education ==
Peerschke was born in Braunschweig, Germany. She grew up in New Jersey, graduated from Rutgers and earned her PhD from New York University in 1980, studying under Dr. Marjorie Zucker.

== Career ==
Peerschke held faculty positions at SUNY Stony Brook, Weill Cornell Medicine, Icahn School of Medicine at Mount Sinai, and Memorial Sloan Kettering. At Memorial Sloan Kettering, she was Vice Chair for Research, Education and Development in the Department of Laboratory Medicine. She directed the hospital hematology and coagulation laboratories and shaped international guidelines on laboratory diagnosis and treatment of bleeding and clotting disorders.

Peerschke worked with Barry Coller to establish how the binding of fibrinogen to Glycoprotein IIb/IIIa is necessary for platelet aggregation. Their work on the resulting complexes, along with monoclonal antibodies she helped develop, led to numerous therapeutics used for cardiovascular disease.

Joining with her husband Dr. Berhane Ghebrehiwet, Peerschke went on to map the interactions of platelets with complement component C1q. Their discoveries built a framework to understand the pathophysiology of pathogen-associated molecular patterns in HIV, hepatitis C, immune thrombocytopenia, and COVID-19.

Peerschke studied both the collagen-like tail region of C1q, which binds calreticulin, and the receptor for the globular head of C1q, known as gC1qR. Her work on the binding of gC1qR to high-molecular-weight kininogen and coagulation factor XII helped elucidate how the kinin–kallikrein system generates bradykinin, thus advancing knowledge in coagulation, inflammation, infection, lupus, and cancer.

Peerschke developed programs for undergraduate and postgraduate medical education in the diagnosis of blood disorders. She contributed to laboratory stewardship efforts which are part of reducing unnecessary health care. She was president of the Academy of Clinical Laboratory Physicians and Scientists and vice president of the North American Specialized Coagulation Laboratory Association (NASCOLA). She served on the ASH education committee, AHA thrombosis study group, NHLBI project review committee, and ISTH international advisory board.

== Awards ==
Gerald T. Evans Award, Academy of Clinical Laboratory Physicians and Scientists, 2011

== Selected articles ==
- Peerschke EI, Zucker MB. Fibrinogen receptor exposure and aggregation of human blood platelets produced by ADP and chilling. Blood. 1981;57:663–70.
- Peerschke EI, Grant RA, Zucker MB. Decreased association of 45calcium with platelets unable to aggregate due to thrombasthenia or prolonged calcium deprivation. Br J Haematol. 1980;46:247–56.
- Peerschke EI. Induction of human platelet fibrinogen receptors by epinephrine in the absence of released ADP. Blood. 1982;60:71–7.
- Peerschke EI. Evidence for interaction between platelet fibrinogen receptors. Blood. 1982;60:973–8.
- Peerschke EI, Wainer JA. Examination of irreversible platelet-fibrinogen interactions. Am J Physiol. 1985;248:C466–72.
- Peerschke EI. Decreased accessibility of platelet-bound fibrinogen to antibody and enzyme probes. Blood. 1989;74:682–9.
- Peerschke EI, Francis CW, Marder VJ. Fibrinogen binding to human blood platelets: effect of gamma chain carboxyterminal structure and length. Blood. 1986;67:385–90.
- Peerschke EI, Galanakis DK. The synthetic RGDS peptide inhibits the binding of fibrinogen lacking intact alpha chain carboxyterminal sequences to human blood platelets. Blood. 1987;69:950–2.
- Peerschke EI. Bound fibrinogen distribution on stimulated platelets. Examination by confocal scanning laser microscopy. Am J Pathol. 1995;147:678–87.
- Peerschke EI. Maintenance of GPIIb-IIIa avidity supporting "irreversible" fibrinogen binding is energy-dependent. J Lab Clin Med. 1999;134:398–404.
- Peerschke EI. Reversible and irreversible binding of fibrinogen to platelets. Platelets. 1997;8:311–7.
- Peerschke EI, Ghebrehiwet B. Human blood platelets possess specific binding sites for C1q. J. Immunol. 1987;138:1537–41.
- Peerschke EI, Ghebrehiwet B. Identification and partial characterization of human platelet C1q binding sites. J. Immunol. 1988;141: 3505–11.
- Peerschke EI, Reid KB, Ghebrehiwet B. Platelet activation by C1q results in the induction of alpha IIb/beta 3 integrins (GPIIb-IIIa) and the expression of P-selectin and procoagulant activity. J Exp Med. 1993;178:579–87.
- Peerschke EI, Reid KB, Ghebrehiwet B. Identification of a novel 33-kDa C1q-binding site on human blood platelets. J. Immunol. 1994;152:5896–901.
