= Phlebotomy =

Medical procedure involving an incision in a vein

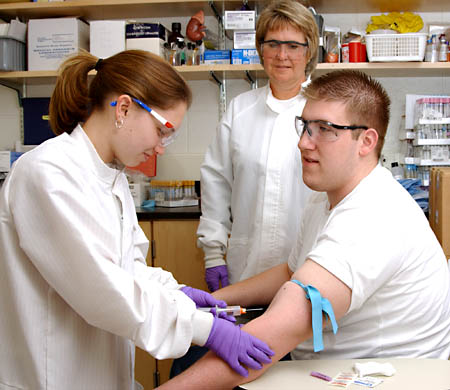
- Students practising phlebotomy
- ICD-9-CM: 38.99
- MeSH: D018962

Phlebotomy is the process of making a puncture in a vein, usually in the arm or hand, with a cannula for the purpose of drawing blood. The procedure itself is known as a venipuncture, which is also used for intravenous therapy. A person who performs a phlebotomy is called a phlebotomist, although most doctors, nurses, and other technicians can also carry out a phlebotomy. In contrast, phlebectomy is the removal of a vein.

Phlebotomies that are carried out in the treatment of some blood disorders are known as therapeutic phlebotomies. The average volume of whole blood drawn in a therapeutic phlebotomy to an adult is 1 unit (450–500 ml) weekly to once every several months, as needed.

== Etymology ==
From Ancient Greek: φλεβοτομία (phlebotomia – phleb 'blood vessel, vein' + tomia 'cutting'), via Old French: flebothomie (modern French phlébotomie).

== Phlebotomies ==
Armed Services Blood Program video of phlebotomy

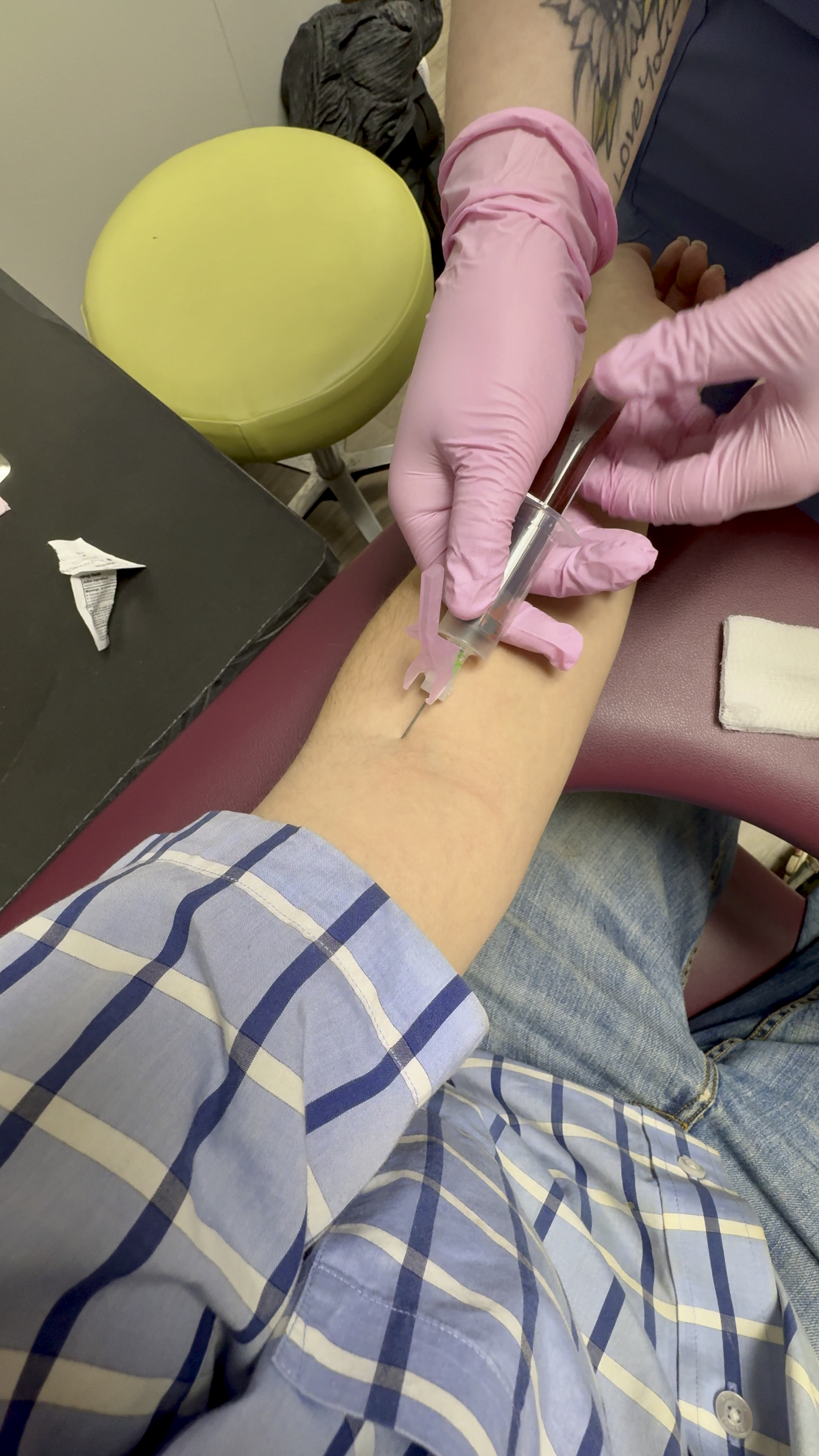
Blood is collected from a vein by a phlebotomist

Phlebotomies are carried out by phlebotomists – people trained to draw blood mostly from veins for clinical or medical testing, transfusions, donations, or research. Blood is collected primarily by performing venipunctures, or by using capillary blood sampling with fingersticks or a heel stick in infants for the collection of minute quantities of blood. The duties of a phlebotomist may include interpreting the tests requested, drawing blood into the correct tubes with the proper additives, accurately explaining the procedure to the person and preparing them accordingly, practicing the required forms of asepsis, practicing standard and universal precautions, restoring hemostasis of the puncture site, giving instructions on post-puncture care, affixing tubes with electronically printed labels, and delivering specimens to a laboratory. Some countries, states, or districts require that phlebotomists be licensed or registered.

A therapeutic phlebotomy may be carried out in the treatment of some blood disorders (examples: hemochromatosis, polycythemia vera, porphyria cutanea tarda), and chronic hives (in research).

=== Australia ===
In Australia, there are a number of courses in phlebotomy offered by educational institutions, but training is typically provided on the job. The minimum primary qualification for phlebotomists in Australia is a Certificate III in Pathology Collection (HLT37215) from an approved educational institution.

=== United Kingdom ===
In the UK no formal qualification or certification is required prior to becoming a phlebotomist as training is usually provided on the job. The NHS offers training with formal certification upon completion.

=== United States ===
Special state certification in the United States is required only in four states: California, Washington, Nevada, and Louisiana. A phlebotomist can become nationally certified through many different organizations. However, California currently only accepts national certificates from six agencies. These include the American Certification Agency (ACA), American Medical Technologists (AMT), American Society for Clinical Pathology (ASCP), National Center for Competency Testing/Multi-skilled Medical Certification Institute (NCCT/MMCI), National Credentialing Agency (NCA), and National Healthcareer Association (NHA). These and other agencies such as the American Society of Phlebotomy Technicians also certify phlebotomists outside the state of California. To qualify to sit for an examination, candidates must complete a full phlebotomy course and provide documentation of clinical or laboratory experience.

=== South Africa ===
In South Africa learnerships to qualify as a Phlebotomy Technician are offered by many public and private educational institutions as well as by private academies owned up by pathology laboratories (such as Ampath Laboratories, Lancet, PathCare) and healthcare service providers (such as Netcare, South African National Blood Service). Some of the larger retail pharmacy chains offering in-store clinical services (such as Clicks, Dis-Chem) also provide training for aspirant phlebotomists. Certification can be obtained from a number of examination and testing institutions. To work as a phlebotomist in South Africa, registration with the Health Professions Council of South Africa (HPCSA) is required.

== Sample tube types ==
Vacutainer/sample tube types for venipuncture/phlebotomy
Tube cap color or type in order of draw	Additive	Usage and comments
Blood culture bottle	Sodium polyanethol sulfonate (anticoagulant) and growth media for microorganisms	Usually drawn first for minimal risk of contamination. Two bottles are typically collected in one blood draw; one for aerobic organisms and one for anaerobic organisms.
Blue ("light blue")	Sodium citrate (weak calcium chelator/anticoagulant)	Coagulation tests such as prothrombin time (PT) and partial thromboplastin time (PTT) and thrombin time (TT). Tube must be filled to the proper line.
Plain red	No additive	Serum: Total complement activity, cryoglobulins
Gold (sometimes red and grey "tiger top")	Clot activator and serum separating gel	Serum-separating tube (SST): Tube inversions promote clotting. Most chemistry, endocrine and serology tests, including hepatitis and HIV.
Orange	Clot activator and serum separating gel	Rapid serum-separating tube (RST).
Dark green	Sodium heparin (anticoagulant)	Chromosome testing, HLA typing, ammonia, lactate
Light green	Lithium heparin (anticoagulant) Plasma separator gel	Plasma. Tube inversions prevent clotting
Lavender ("purple")	EDTA (chelator / anticoagulant)	Whole blood: CBC, ESR, Coombs test, platelet antibodies, flow cytometry, blood levels of tacrolimus and cyclosporin
Pink	K_{2} EDTA (chelator / anticoagulant)	Blood typing and cross-matching, direct Coombs test, HIV viral load
Royal blue ("navy")	EDTA (chelator / anticoagulant)	Trace elements, heavy metals, most drug levels, toxicology
Tan	Sodium EDTA (chelator / anticoagulant)	Lead
Gray	Fluoride Oxalate: Sodium fluoride (glycolysis inhibitor); Potassium oxalate (anticoagulant)	Glucose, lactate, toxicology
Yellow	Acid-citrate-dextrose A (anticoagulant)	Tissue typing, DNA studies, HIV cultures
Pearlescent ("white")	Separating gel and (K_{2})EDTA	PCR for adenovirus, toxoplasma and HHV-6
Black	Sodium Citrate	Paediatric ESR
QuantiFERON Grey, Green, Yellow, Purple	QuantiFERON: 1. Grey (nil) tube 2. Green (TB1 antigen) tube 3. Yellow (TB2 antigen) tube 4. Purple (mitogen) tube	Tuberculosis

== Draw station ==
A phlebotomy draw station is a place where blood is drawn from patients for laboratory testing, transfusions, donations, or research purposes. The blood is typically drawn via venipuncture or a finger stick by a healthcare professional such as a phlebotomist, nurse, or medical assistant. The draw station typically includes a padded chair or a bed for patients prone to fainting during blood draws. Draw stations can be found in various settings, such as hospitals, clinics, blood donation centers, and independent laboratories or as part of patient service centers (PSC).

== History ==
Early phlebotomists used techniques such as leeches and incision to extract blood from the body. Bloodletting was used as a therapeutic as well as a prophylactic process, thought to remove toxins from the body and to balance the humors. While physicians did perform bloodletting, it was a specialty of barber surgeons, the primary provider of health care to most people in the medieval and early modern eras.

== See also ==
- Cytotechnologist
- Injection (medicine)
- Medical technologist
- List of surgeries by type
- Phlebotominae
- Phlebotomy licensure
