= SmithKline Beecham Clinical Laboratories =

American-based medical laboratory

SmithKline Beecham Clinical Laboratories (SBCL) was an American-based medical laboratory company that was acquired by Quest Diagnostics in 1999 for $1.3 billion.

== Controversies ==
In 1989, SBCL had to pay a $1.5 million fine for illegal laboratory referral kickbacks.

In 1997, Operation LabScam forced SBCL to agree to pay a $325 million settlement for billing Medicare and Medicaid for tests that physicians were misled into believing were free, violating the 1863 False Claims Act.

In 1998, a phlebotomist at an SBCL facility in Palo Alto, California was exposed as reusing needles to save money. As a result, over 3,600 patients had to receive testing and counseling for HIV and hepatitis. The incident led to phlebotomy licensure in California.
