= Stanley Inhorn =

American physician (1928–2025)

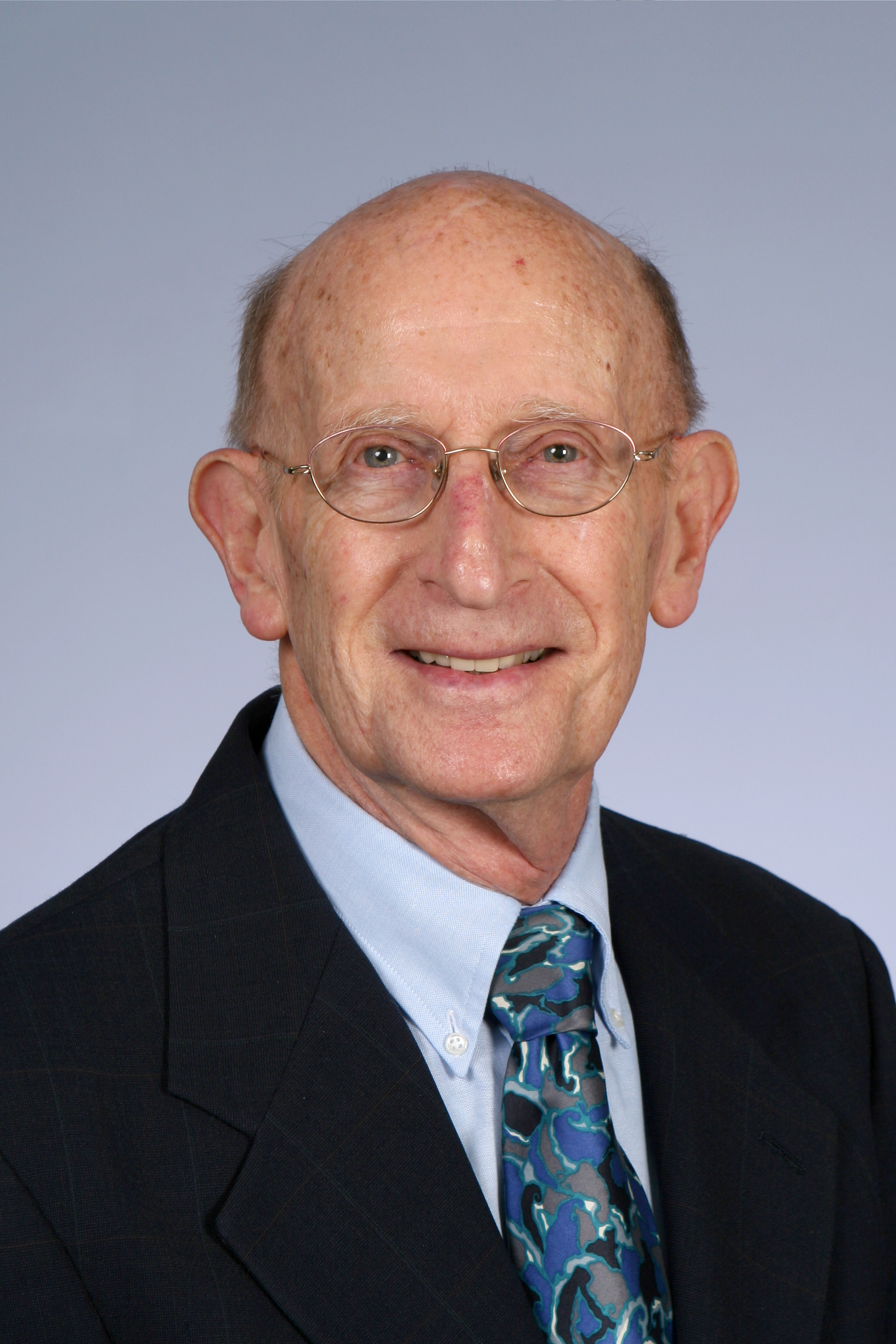
- Born: August 1, 1928; Philadelphia, Pennsylvania, U.S.
- Died: February 19, 2025 (aged 96)
- Education: MD
- Alma mater: Columbia University Medical School
- Employer: University of Wisconsin-Madison
- Title: Professor of Pathology and Laboratory Medicine; Professor of Preventive Medicine
- Board member of: American Cancer Society (President, Wisconsin Division), American Public Health Association's Committee on Laboratory Standards and Practices, Association of Public Health Laboratories, American Society of Cytopathology (President), Centers for Disease Control and Prevention's Medical Laboratory Services Advisory Committee, Clinical Laboratory Improvement Act (CLIA) Advisory Board
- Spouse: Shirley (Sherburne) Inhorn
- Children: Lowell, Marcia, and Roger Inhorn
- Awards: Papinicolaou Award (American Society of Cytopathology), Lifetime Achievement and Gold Standard Awards (Association of Public Health Laboratories)

Stanley L. Inhorn (August 1, 1928 – February 19, 2025) was an American physician who was professor of Pathology and Laboratory Medicine at the University of Wisconsin-Madison, where he also served as Director of the Wisconsin State Laboratory of Hygiene (WSLH) on the UW campus. A graduate of Cleveland's Western Reserve University and Columbia University Medical School, Inhorn moved to Madison in 1953 to pursue an internship and residency in pathology before being appointed Assistant Professor of Pathology and Assistant Director of the WSLH in 1960. He became Director of the WSLH in 1966, a position he held until 1979, when he was asked by the UW Medical School to create a Department of Pathology and Laboratory Medicine.

== History ==
=== Research ===
During his long career at WSLH, Inhorn pursued many different lines of medical research and public health intervention. In 1960, WSLH was involved in a large community program to promote the new Pap smear test for detecting the early stages of cervical cancer. Inhorn devoted many hours to training personnel in family planning clinics on how to carefully make and screen the Pap smear, both of which are essential to its success. During this time, Inhorn also became active in the American Society of Cytopathology. He chaired its committees to develop best practices in laboratory operation, and he eventually became president of ASC, later receiving the Papanicolaou Award for his contributions to the field of cytopathology.

In addition, by 1960, new techniques in the field of cytogenetics permitted the study of infants and children with congenital malformations. Inhorn provided the laboratory component that permitted pediatricians from the UW Medical Center to study a large number of affected children. In particular, Down syndrome had been identified as having three chromosome 21s, instead of two. The Cytogenetics Lab at WSLH identified another trisomy (trisomy 13), an important discovery contributing to the genomic revolution that followed.

=== American Cancer Society ===
Inhorn's ongoing interest in cervical cancer was the reason that he joined the American Cancer Society, Wisconsin Division, in 1967. He was Chair of the State Cancer Prevention Study II, and in 1986, he headed a demonstration project with a number of Wisconsin hospitals to determine the acceptance of offering low-cost mammography as a screening test for breast cancer. Inhorn served as President of the Wisconsin Division from 1970 to 1972, continuing on the board until 2010. He also served on the national American Cancer Society Board from 1982 to 1990.

=== Medicare ===
Inhorn was also involved in the implementation of Medicare, which was enacted in 1965 as a new federal program to provide health insurance to citizens over age 65. As the largest health care program ever undertaken by the U.S. government, Medicare required quality assurance practices for all facets of its healthcare provision. Soon, another bill was passed called the Clinical Laboratory Improvement Act of 1967, requiring QA practices in the delivery of laboratory testing. To develop the regulations for CLIA-67, a meeting was held at the Communicable Disease Center, CDC (later renamed the Centers for Disease Control and Prevention). The Social Security Administration was also involved, and charged with defining personnel standards for laboratories, such as Director, Supervisor, or Technologist, based on education and experience.

Inhorn was selected in 1973 to chair the committee to develop an exam for cytotechnologists who had on-the-job Pap smear training, but not the formal university education required by the new Medicare-related QA standards. Inhorn was also selected to chair the Proficiency Testing Committee, which had the responsibility to fashion a program that would define the frequency of testing, the number of samples, controls, standards, scoring methodology, passing grades, and requirements to continue provision of services for each specialty. Furthermore, Inhorn was selected to help the CDC, given that there were few established standards and methods to use in assessment of medical laboratory performance. To facilitate the work of the CDC, a Medical Laboratory Services Advisory Committee was appointed. Inhorn was the only State Laboratory Director to serve on the MLSAC Advisory Committee, perhaps because the WSLH had a strong history of proficiency testing in clinical laboratories in Wisconsin. Inhorn's assignment for CLIA-67 was to develop a protocol for PT programs to be used in the future.

Many changes had been made to CLIA-67, but major weaknesses in the program still existed. It would take another two decades before new federal legislation, called CLIA-88, would address these shortcomings. Inhorn was appointed to the new CLIA-88 advisory board and served during the first two years of its existence. During the ensuing years, many more health laboratories opened in the U.S. and new technology introduced built-in controls, so that performance was validated without confirmation by laboratory workers.

=== American Public Health Association ===
Inhorn was also involved in the American Public Health Association, the largest organization of public health professionals in the United States. One of the APHA's roles involved developing methodological publications for environmental laboratories, such as Standard Methods for the Examination of Water and Wastewater. Through its Committee on Laboratory Standards and Practices, the APHA developed clinical laboratory books, such as Diagnostic Procedures for Bacterial, Mycotic, and Rickettsial Diseases. In 1971, CLASP determined that a comprehensive book on quality assurance would be useful for laboratory personnel faced with new CLIA guidelines. A task force was established with Inhorn serving as chair, and a meeting was held at CDC in March 1974 to determine the outline of a book consisting of 5 general chapters on QA and 15 chapters on specific health sciences. The book, called Quality Assurance Practices for Health Laboratories, was published in 1978, with Inhorn serving as editor.

Inhorn continued to work as the medical director of the WSLH until he retired from UW in 1998 as professor of Pathology and Laboratory Medicine and Preventive Medicine. During the last 20 years of his career and the 10 years after he retired, Inhorn continued to do research and development work in the field of QA. During these decades, major changes were being implemented in the public health laboratory world. For example, it was recognized that QA was necessary in specimen handling and data reporting, as well as in laboratory performance. It was also recognized that public health labs interacted with many programs not often recognized, including private labs, first responders, and government agencies involved in bioterrorism threats. State Laboratory Networks would be required in order to develop an effective national network. The Association of Public Health Laboratories created a program, called the Laboratory System Improvement Program, to assist states with developing their own L-SIPs. Inhorn played a major role in helping to establish L-SIP on a national level. For his achievements, the APHL awarded him both the Lifetime Achievement Award and the Gold Standard Award.

== Death ==
Inhorn died February 19, 2025, at the age of 96.
