= Operation LabScam =

1990s American fraud investigation

Operation LabScam was a United States government investigation in the 1990s by a seven-member taskforce into laboratory billing fraud resulting in $800 million in fines.

Fraudulent billing practices included labs billing Medicare and other government healthcare programs for medically unnecessary tests, upcoded tests, tests that were never conducted, and providing kickbacks to physicians.

The following labs were implicated: Damon Clinical Laboratories, SmithKline Beecham Clinical Laboratories (SBCL), Corning Life Sciences, Liberty Testing Laboratory.
