= American Society of Cytopathology =

Pathology organization

The American Society of Cytopathology (ASC), founded in 1951, is a national professional society of physicians, cytotechnologists and scientists who are dedicated to cytopathology, which involves the cytologic method of diagnostic pathology. They have more than 3000 members including representatives for other countries. The ASC provides a forum where physicians and cytotechnologists can interact with one another. Although this society is involved with guidelines for cytotechnologists and admits certain qualified cytotechnologists, it should not be confused with the American Society for Cytotechnology (ASCT).

The official journal of the ASC is the Journal of the American Society of Cytopathology (JASC) published bimonthly.
