= National Healthcareer Association =

American professional certification agency

National Health career Association (NHA)
- Industry: Healthcare
- Headquarters: Leawood, Kansas, United States
- Services: Professional certification
- Parent: Ascend Learning
- Website: nhanow.com

The National Healthcareer Association (NHA) is a national professional certification agency for healthcare workers in the United States. Granting credentials in more than 8 allied health specialties, it is an organizational member of the National Organization for Competency Assurance (NOCA). The National Healthcareer Association partners with educational institutions nationwide with over 350,000 certified individuals. It is one of the largest certification and continuing education providers. The National Healthcareer Association works with health training institutions, hospitals, unions, and the US Defense Department through DANTES; it has approved over 2400 training/testing locations throughout the US and in several countries. These institutions offer allied health programs and use the national certification as their "End Of Program Credential." Healthcare professional certification is different from a license such as a Registered Nurse, or a licensed practical nurse. Although certification is not state mandated and/or regulated in all 50 states, most employers and industry organizations prefer their employees to be certified.

== Certified occupations ==
Certified technicians work alongside licensed nurses and/or doctors. These positions would include individuals working as phlebotomists, EKG technicians, clinical medical assistants, patient care technicians, medical laboratory assistants, medical transcriptionists, medical administrative assistants, billing and coding specialists, mental health technicians, and surgical/operating room technicians. Many hospitals, private practices, and organizations throughout the country require national certification as a competence standard. The National Healthcareer Association is a part of the National Organization for Competency Assurance. The National Healthcareer Association helps set performance ethics standards among healthcare professionals, establish education requirements, and set guidelines for national certifications.

== Continuing education requirements ==
Due to the changes and updates in the healthcare industry, certified technicians are required to maintain their certification by completing continuing education credits throughout the year, or the duration of their certificate's expiration date. These continuing education credits or units (CEUs) can be earned through the certification agency or through their employer and then verified by the National Healthcareer Association. Continuing education ensures competency standards throughout employment of the certified individual, and keeps them aware of the changes and new regulations in the allied healthcare industry.

== Certification exams ==
The National Healthcareer Association writes, develops, and publishes the certification exams for allied health professions: medical assistant, phlebotomy, EKG, pharmacy technician, medical billing and coding, administrative medical assistants, patient care technician and electronic health records.

== Partnerships ==
The State of New Jersey's program was the Certified Patient Care Technician (CPCT) Program. It was an accelerated, three-week program for UH Nursing staff and shows the coordination that exists between the National Healthcareer Association and state and regional associations. The training and certification were sponsored by UMDNJ's Career Training and Advancement Center (CTAC), coordinated by the Department of Human Resources and grant-funded by the Bank of America. CTAC and nursing leadership at the University Hospital worked closely with the National Healthcareer Association to develop a comprehensive program specific to the needs of the university. The CPCT model advanced the skills and competencies of incumbent Nursing Assistants in entry-level positions within the nursing career ladder while instituting a new, team-based, patient care model. The new skills developed were phlebotomy, EKG/ECG, basic patient care and medical assisting skills.

The United States Department of Defense's agency, Defense Activity for Non-Traditional Education Support (DANTES), offers the National Healthcareer Association's (NHA) certification exams at all 520 DANTES test sites worldwide. The National Healthcareer Association's partnership with DANTES offered new opportunities to the thousands of military trainees as well as experienced medical personnel stationed around the world.

== Global expansion ==
The National Healthcareer Association (NHA), the largest Allied Health Certification Agency in the US and the National Lutheran Health and Medical Board (NLHMB), Chennai, India, which is a leading NGO and sponsor of Two Universities have come together to offer the US employment National Healthcareer Association Certificate Examination in India.

== See also ==
- Jones & Bartlett Learning
