= Quest Diagnostics =

American clinical laboratory company

Quest Diagnostics Incorporated
- Type: Public
- Traded as: NYSE: DGX; S&P 500 component
- Industry: Health care
- Founded: 1967; 59 years ago, in New York City, U.S.
- Founder: Paul Brown
- Headquarters: Secaucus, New Jersey, U.S.
- Area served: United States; Brazil; Mexico
- Key people: Jim Davis (CEO)
- Services: Medical testing; Molecular diagnostics; Clinical chemistry
- Revenue: ▲US$11.0 billion (2025)
- Net income: ▲US$992 million (2025)
- Number of employees: 65,000 (2026)
- Website: questdiagnostics.com

Quest Diagnostics Incorporated is an American clinical laboratory. A Fortune 500 company, Quest operates in the United States, Puerto Rico, Mexico, and Brazil. Quest also maintains collaborative agreements with various hospitals and clinics across the globe.

As of 2020, the company had approximately 48,000 employees, and it generated more than $7.7 billion in revenue in 2019. The company offers access to diagnostic testing services for cancer, cardiovascular disease, infectious disease, neurological disorders, COVID-19, and employment and court-ordered drug testing.

== History ==
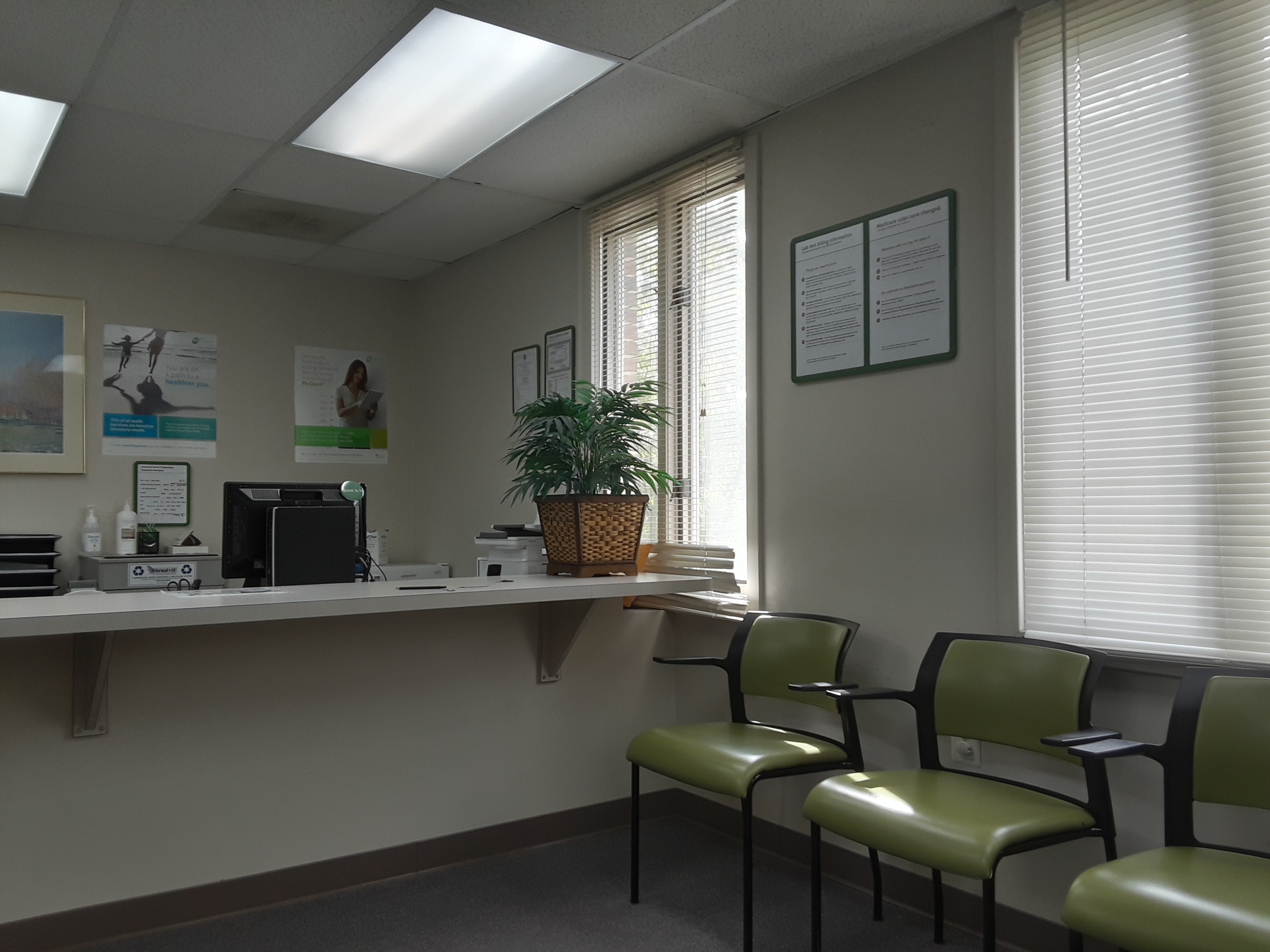
Interior of a Patient Service Center in Franconia, Virginia

=== 1960–1995 ===
Originally founded as Metropolitan Pathology Laboratory, Inc. in 1967 by Paul A. Brown, MD, the clinical laboratory underwent a variety of name changes. In 1969, the company's name changed to MetPath, Inc. with headquarters in Teaneck, New Jersey. By 1982, MetPath was acquired by what was then known as Corning Glass Works and was subsequently renamed Corning Clinical Laboratories.

=== 1996–2000 ===
On December 31, 1996, Quest Diagnostics became an independent company as a spin-off from Corning. Kenneth W. Freeman was appointed as CEO during this transition. Over the next year, Quest acquired a clinical laboratory division of Branford, Connecticut–based Diagnostic Medical Laboratory, Inc. (DML). Two years later in 1999, Quest added SmithKline Beecham Clinical Laboratories to their subsidiaries; which includes a joint venture ownership with CompuNet Clinical Laboratory. The purchase of SmithKline Beecham also included the lab's medical sample transport airline (ICAO: LBQ, call sign: LABQUEST) originally founded in 1988.

In 1997, Quest and Banner Health formed a joint venture creating the Arizona based Sonora Quest laboratory, a business unit of Laboratory Sciences of Arizona. This entity represents the operations of Quest Diagnostics in the Arizona regional market.

=== 2001–2015 ===
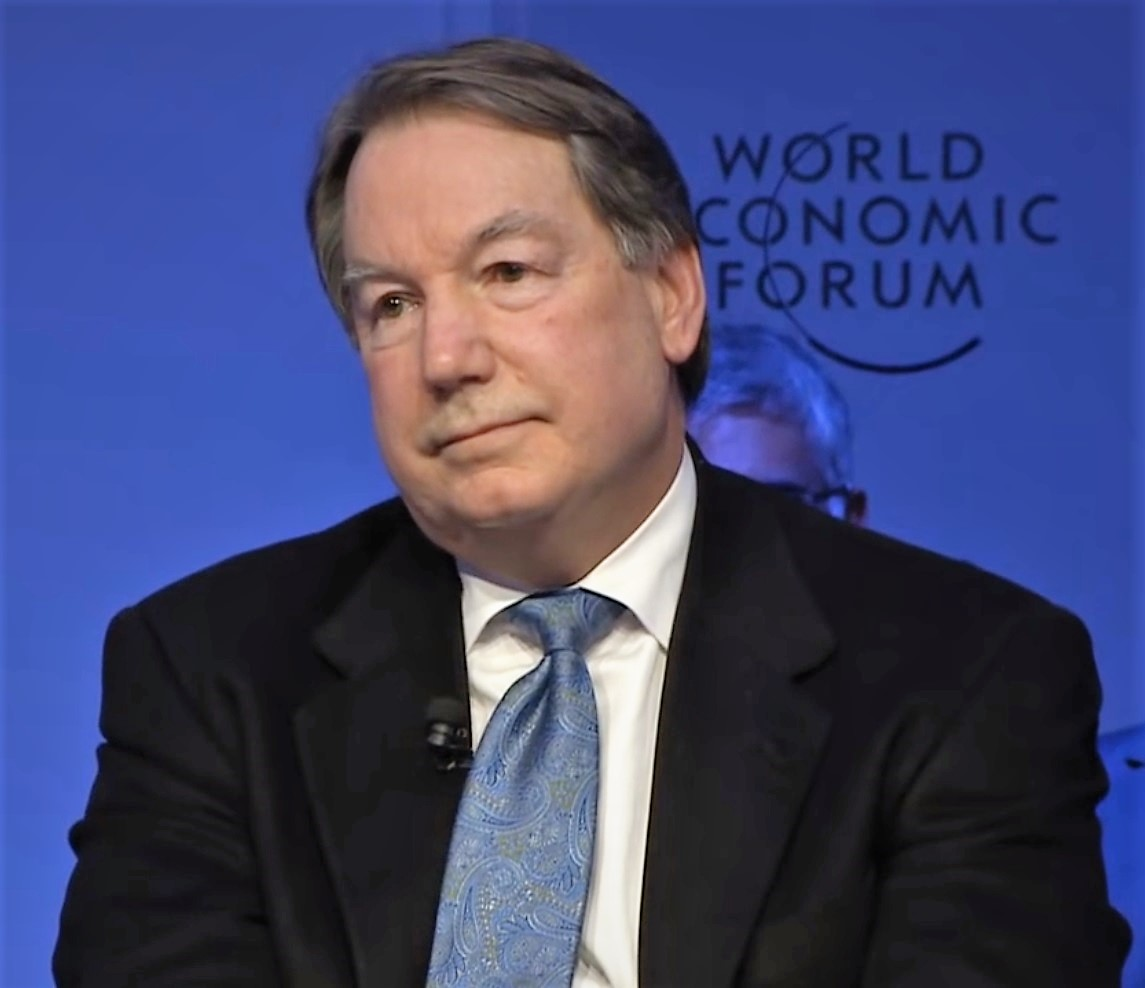
Steve Rusckowski, the chairman, president, and CEO of Quest Diagnostics at the World Economic Forum in 2017

From May 2004 to April 2012, Surya Mohapatra served as the company's President and CEO. In 2007 Quest acquired diagnostic testing equipment company AmeriPath. In response to Mohapatra's resignation after eight years with Quest, former Philips Healthcare CEO Stephen Rusckowski was appointed. Under Rusckowski, Quest Diagnostics teamed up with central New England's largest health care system, UMass Memorial Health Care, to purchase its clinical outreach laboratory.

=== 2016–present ===
In 2016, Quest collaborated with Safeway to bring testing services to twelve of its stores in California, Maryland, Virginia, Texas and Colorado.

By the end of 2017, Quest, in partnership with Walmart, incorporated laboratory testing in about 15 of their locations in Texas and Florida.

In May 2018, the company announced it will become an in-network laboratory provider to UnitedHealthcare starting in 2019, providing access to 48 million plan members.

In September 2018, Quest moved its headquarters from Madison, where it was located since 2007, to Secaucus, New Jersey.

In November 2018, Quest launched QuestDirect, a consumer-initiated testing service that allows patients to order health and wellness lab testing from home.

In March 2020, the company launched a COVID-19 testing service. As of July 2020, Quest had performed more than 9.2 million COVID-19 molecular tests and 2.8 million serology tests.

In April 2024, Quest has added a new blood screening to their AD-Detect product line. This test will analyze the blood for a specific Alzheimer's protein, pTau-217.

In February 2025, Quest acquired select assets of Fresenius Medical Care's Spectra laboratories. Under a separate agreement, Quest now offers clinical testing and lab services related to dialysis and end-stage kidney disease.

== Acquisitions ==
Date	Company	Business	Location	Value (USD)	References
1999	SmithKline Beecham Clinical Laboratories	Laboratory	US	1.3×10^{9}	
2001	MedPlus, Inc. (Nasdaq: MEDP)	healthcare technology company	Ohio		
2002	American Medical Laboratories, Inc. (AML) & LabPortal, Inc.	healthcare technology company	Virginia	500,000,000	
2003	Unilab Corporation (Nasdaq: ULAB)	healthcare technology company	California	800,000,000	
2005	LabOne, Inc. (Nasdaq: LABS)	Employer drug testing and paramedical testing division	Lenexa, Kansas	934,000,000	
2006	Focus Diagnostics, Inc.	Infectious and immunologic disease laboratory	Virginia	185,000,000	
2007	Hemocue	point-of-care diagnostic testing	Sweden		
2007	AmeriPath (and subsidiary Specialty Laboratories)	cancer diagnostic testing			
2011	Athena Diagnostics	cancer diagnostic testing			
2011	Celera Corporation	NGS			
2013	Outreach for UMass Memorial Health	Laboratory	Massachusetts		
2014	Solstas Lab Partners Group	Laboratory	North Carolina	570,000,000	
2014	Summit Health, Inc.				
2015	Barnabas Health	Laboratory operations	New Jersey		
2017	Cleveland HeartLab	Laboratory			
2018	Oxford Immunotec.	Laboratory			
2019	Boyce & Bynum Pathology Laboratories	Laboratory			
2020	Outreach for Memorial Hermann Health System	Outreach Laboratory	Houston		
2020	Hackensack Meridian Health	Laboratory operations	New Jersey		
2020	Blueprint Genetics	Genetic testing and Sequencing	Helsinki, Finland	108,000,000	
2021	Outreach for Mercy	Outreach Laboratory	US		
2023	Outreach for NewYork-Presbyterian Hospital	Outreach Laboratory	New York		
2023	Haystack Oncology	healthcare technology company	Hamburg		
2024	Outreach for Steward Health Care System	Outreach Laboratory	US		
2024	Lenco Diagnostic Laboratories	Laboratory	Brooklyn, New York		
2025	Spectra Laboratories	Laboratory	New Jersey		

=== Partnerships ===
- 2005: Forms a strategic alliance with Ciphergen Biosystems to commercialize novel proteomic tests.

== Controversies ==
Quest Diagnostics set a record in April 2009 when it paid $302 million to the government to settle a Medicare fraud case alleging the company sold faulty medical testing kits. It was the largest qui tam (whistleblower) settlement paid by a medical laboratory for manufacturing and distributing a faulty product. In May 2011, Quest paid $241 million to the state of California to settle a False Claims Act case that alleged the company had overcharged Medi-Cal, the state's Medicaid program, and provided illegal kickbacks as incentives for healthcare providers to use Quest labs.

In 2018, Quest Diagnostics was among a number of U.S.–based laboratories linked to inaccuracies of over 200 women's cervical smear tests for CervicalCheck, Ireland's national screening program. Audits of the testing performed by Quest (and another subcontractor, Clinical Pathology Laboratories, Inc. of Austin, Texas) showed a high rate of errors in analysis of samples which led to lawsuits and a government inquiry. Quest and the Irish government continue to settle the resulting lawsuits.

On June 3, 2019, Quest announced that American Medical Collection Agency (AMCA), a billing collections service provider, had informed Quest Diagnostics that an unauthorized user had access to AMCA’s system containing personal information AMCA received from various entities, including from Quest. AMCA provides billing collections services to Optum360, which in turn is a Quest contractor. AMCA later went bankrupt after the breach.
