= Professional Acknowledgment for Continuing Education =

Professional Acknowledgment for Continuing Education credits, or PACE credits, are a type of continuing education credit sponsored by the American Society for Clinical Laboratory Science (ASCLS). PACE credits fulfill continuing education requirements for various state and regional laboratory regulation boards. Laboratorians may earn PACE credits by attending seminars, completing mail-away courses, or taking CD-ROM or web-based courses.
