= American Association of Pathologists' Assistants =

The American Association of Pathologists' Assistants (AAPA) is a professional association for laboratory pathologists' assistants (PA).

== History ==
AAPA was founded in 1972 by the first 5 PA graduates from Duke University Hospital.
