= Medical laboratory assistant =

Medical laboratory assistants (MLAs) also known as clinical laboratory assistants (CLA) or clinical assistants (CA) prepare, and in some cases process samples within a pathology laboratory. They also utilise pre-analytical systems in order for biomedical scientists (BMS) or Medical Laboratory Scientific Officers to process the biochemical tests requested on the sample. The majority of an MLA's time is spent in processing specimens. As such, the MLA has to have excellent knowledge of their particular sample acceptance policy, whilst obeying the data protection act, patient confidentiality, COSHH and the Caldicott rules.

Other duties an MLA may undertake include, setting up blood analyzers, running Quality Controls and manual controls prior to a BMS undertaking analysis on samples. Maintenance and decontamination is essential for the function of the machinery therefore MLAs carry out this role on a weekly or monthly basis.

A typical method of sample acceptance (in a clinical chemistry lab) is as follows:

1. Sample is received.
2. Sample is checked (to ensure that the sample is sent in the correct container for the specimen).
3. Patient's details checked and matched on both form and sample (non-matching samples and/or forms rejected).
4. Sample and form labelled with unique identifying number (UIN).
5. Tests requested on form receipted onto UIN on computer system.
6. Samples placed either on pre-analytical system by MLA or analysed immediately by BMS (dependent on test requested).
7. UIN attached to patient using patient identifying details on form.

MLA's also deal with all sample queries and give low level advice to clinical staff on sample acceptance and correct sampling method. They may also do minor upkeep on the pre-analytical systems as well as further upkeep on some point of care analysers — depending on the laboratory in which they are based.

== History ==
In the United States, the profession began in the 1950s due to a shortage of medical technologists in rural areas and physician owned laboratories. MLA positions were more prevalent prior to laboratory automation, but have made a comeback due to the ongoing laboratory staffing shortage.

== Requirements ==
Requirements for a position of medical laboratory assistant vary from state to state, but they are generally as follows:

- Legal age (18+ years)
- High school diploma or equivalent
- State-approved training
- Successful completion of certification exam

Medical laboratory assistants are required to have good analytical abilities and keen attention to detail. They must be able to work under pressure and display manual dexterity. Because they work with minute substances and technical equipment, good vision and computer skills are mandatory.

== See also ==
- Medical technologist
