= Pathologists' assistant =

Type of physician extender

A pathologists' assistant (PA or PathA) is a physician extender whose expertise lies in gross examination of surgical specimens as well as performing hospital, medicolegal, and forensic autopsies. Their education is analogous to physician assistants, consisting of a didactic and a clinical component and concluding in a master's degree. Certification of pathologists' assistants is through a board exam by the American Society for Clinical Pathology (ASCP). In the United States, the profession is represented by the American Association of Pathologists' Assistants (AAPA).

Pathologists' Assistants in the United States are currently only required to be licensed in three states: Nevada, West Virginia, and New York. In most other states, the scope of PAs falls under CLIA high complexity testing which requires an associate degree.

== General overview ==
Pathologists' assistants work under the indirect or direct supervision of a board certified anatomical pathologist, who ultimately renders a diagnosis based on the PA's detailed gross examination and/or tissue submission for microscopic evaluation. Requirements to become a certified pathologists' assistant include graduation from a National Accrediting Agency for Clinical Laboratory Sciences (NAACLS) accredited education program and successfully passing the American Society for Clinical Pathology (ASCP) certification exam, which is not legally required to perform gross examinations in most states. Some states such as West Virginia, Nevada, and New York require a license for pathologists' assistants. All pathologists' assistants are allied health workers who need to be CLIA 88 compliant to perform these high complexity tasks with indirect/direct supervision of a pathologist. With ongoing changes in health care, a growing population of retiring pathologists, and a decreasing number of pathology residents, well trained PAs are in high demand due to their extensive level of training and contribution to the overall efficiency of the pathology laboratory.

In addition to the major responsibilities outlined above, a pathologists' assistant may also perform the following tasks (for a complete list, refer to AAPA Scope of Practice):

- Frozen sectioning for intraoperative consultation
- Preparing tissue samples for flow cytometry, immunohistochemical (IHC) stains, genetic testing, microbiology culturing, and for various other laboratory evaluations
- Gross specimen photography
- Training pathology residents, PA fellows, and other pathology lab personnel (as needed)
- Fulfilling roles in managerial duties, instructional positions, and supervisory roles
- Research

While many PAs are employed in hospitals, they may also gain employment in private pathology laboratories/groups, medical examiner's offices, morgues, government or reference laboratories, or universities, and may be self-employed and provide contract work.

== History of profession ==
The idea of physician extenders was conceived in 1966 by physician-educator Eugene A. Stead at Duke University, where the first physician assistant program was established. Three years later, also at Duke, Chairman of Pathology, Dr. Thomas Kinney established the first pathologists’ assistant program. As of June 2025, seventeen accredited programs have been established across the United States and Canada and six others are in various stages of accreditation.

== Education ==
While curriculum may vary somewhat from program to program, all accredited pathologists' assistants programs are two-year masters degrees that include didactic and clinical training, similar to physician associate programs. The didactic year includes education in surgical and autopsy pathology, anatomy, histology, and laboratory operations. Students are then placed in a clinical setting with affiliated hospitals and/or medical examiner's offices to learn surgical and autopsy dissection. Pathologists' assistant programs are accredited by NAACLS and attending an accredited program is the only route to certification by the ASCP-BOC. Pathologists' assistants that have passed the ASCP certification exam use the post-nominal letters "PA(ASCP)". PA programs collectively graduate approximately 245 students a year. As of 2024, over 3000 pathologists’ assistants have been certified.

Universities offering pathologists' assistant degrees include:

1. Anderson University* Master of Medical Science (MMS), Pathologists’ Assistant Studies
2. Carroll University** Master of Science in Pathologists' Assistant Studies
3. Drexel University* Master of Science in Pathologists’ Assistant Studies
4. Duke University* Master of Health Science
5. Loma Linda University* Master’s Degree in Health Science, Pathologists’ Assistant
6. Medical University of South Carolina*** Master of Science in Pathologists' Assistant Studies Program
7. Old Dominion University EVMS* Master of Health Sciences, Pathologists’ Assistant
8. Quinnipiac University* Master of Health Science
9. Rosalind Franklin University* Master of Science in Pathologists' Assistant Studies
10. Touro University* Master of Science
11. Tulane University* Master of Science in Anatomic Pathology
12. University of Alberta* MSc with Specialization in Pathologists' Assistant
13. University of Calgary* Master of Pathologists' Assistant
14. University of Jamestown*** Master of Health Science
15. University of Maryland Baltimore* Master of Science in Pathology
16. University of Tennessee Health Science Center* Master's of Health Science (MHS) in Pathologists' Assistants
17. University of Texas Health Science Center at Houston*** Masters in Pathologists' Assistant (MS PathA)
18. University of Texas Medical Branch at Galveston* Master of Pathologists’ Assistant
19. University of Toledo* Master of Science in Biomedical Science
20. University of Toronto* Master of Health Science Degree in Laboratory Medicine - Pathologists’ Assistant Field
21. University of Washington*** Master of Science in Anatomic Pathology
22. University of Western Ontario* Master of Clinical Science in Pathologists' Assistant Studies
23. Wayne State University* Master of Science in Pathologists' Assistant Studies
24. West Virginia University* Master of Health Science

As of 10/20/2026, the programs above have the following status with the National Accrediting Agency for Clinical Laboratory Sciences:

|*| Accredited

|**| Serious Applicant Status

|***| Submitted documentation to become accredited

== Education and certification ==
Pathologists' assistants have been employed in pathology labs for over 40 years. Formal training programs slowly appeared (there were four nationwide in the late 1990s). NAACLS began accrediting PathA programs in the late 1990s, and then programs slowly continued their transitions from bachelor's to master's programs as their number increased. Prior to ASCP certification, which came about in 2005, the AAPA had a fellowship status that program trained pathologists' assistants or on-the-job trained (OJT) pathologists' assistants (who could do specific coursework and three years of active employment) could join only based on passing a rigorous exam that parallels the current ASCP certification exam. The OJT route was eliminated at the end of 2007. The professional association uniting PAs is the American Association of Pathologists' Assistants. Part of their duties as an association is to provide continuing medical education credits (CME) in order to keep members current on advances and procedures in the field that must be completed every three years in order to maintain ASCP certification.

== In popular culture ==
The 2020 novel The Grave Below features a pathologists' assistant as a prominent character.
