= Paul A. Brown =

American physician

- Born: April 1, 1938; Massachusetts
- Died: January 7, 2024 (aged 85); Florida
- Education: Harvard College; Tufts University School of Medicine
- Occupations: Academic, businessman, pathologist and writer

Paul A. Brown (April 1, 1938 – January 7, 2024) was an American academic, businessman, pathologist and writer.

== Education ==
He attended Harvard College (1960) and the Tufts University School of Medicine (1964), located in Boston, Massachusetts. At Harvard he lived in Leverett House.

He underwent professional training in pathology at the Tufts-New England Medical Center (1964–65), also located Boston; and Columbia-Presbyterian Hospital (1965–69), located in New York City, New York.

== Career ==
He served as the chief of pathology at Portsmouth Naval Hospital (1969–70), located in Portsmouth, Virginia.

Brown was a member of the Board of Trustees at Tufts University, the chairman of the Board of Overseers at Tufts University School of Medicine, part of the Visiting Committee at Boston University School of Medicine, and part of the Visiting Committee and instructor in pathology at the Columbia University College of Physicians and Surgeons.

In 1967, Brown founded MetPath, an American company providing clinical-laboratory services. MetPath was acquired by Corning Glass Works for $140 million in 1982 and later spun off as Quest Diagnostics (DGX) in 1996.

He also founded HEARx in 1986, which was renamed to HearUSA and was acquired by Siemens AG for $130 million in 2011.

Brown co-wrote, with Richard D. Hoffmann, the 1998 book Success in the Business Jungle – Secrets of an Entrepreneurial Animal (Pittsburgh, Pennsylvania: Dorrance Publishing; ISBN 978-0-805-94336-8).

On Jan. 7, 2024, Paul A. Brown MD, aged 85, died at his home in Florida.

== See also ==
- List of Boston University people
- List of Columbia University people
- List of entrepreneurs
- List of Harvard University people
- List of pathologists
- List of Tufts University people
