= False billing =

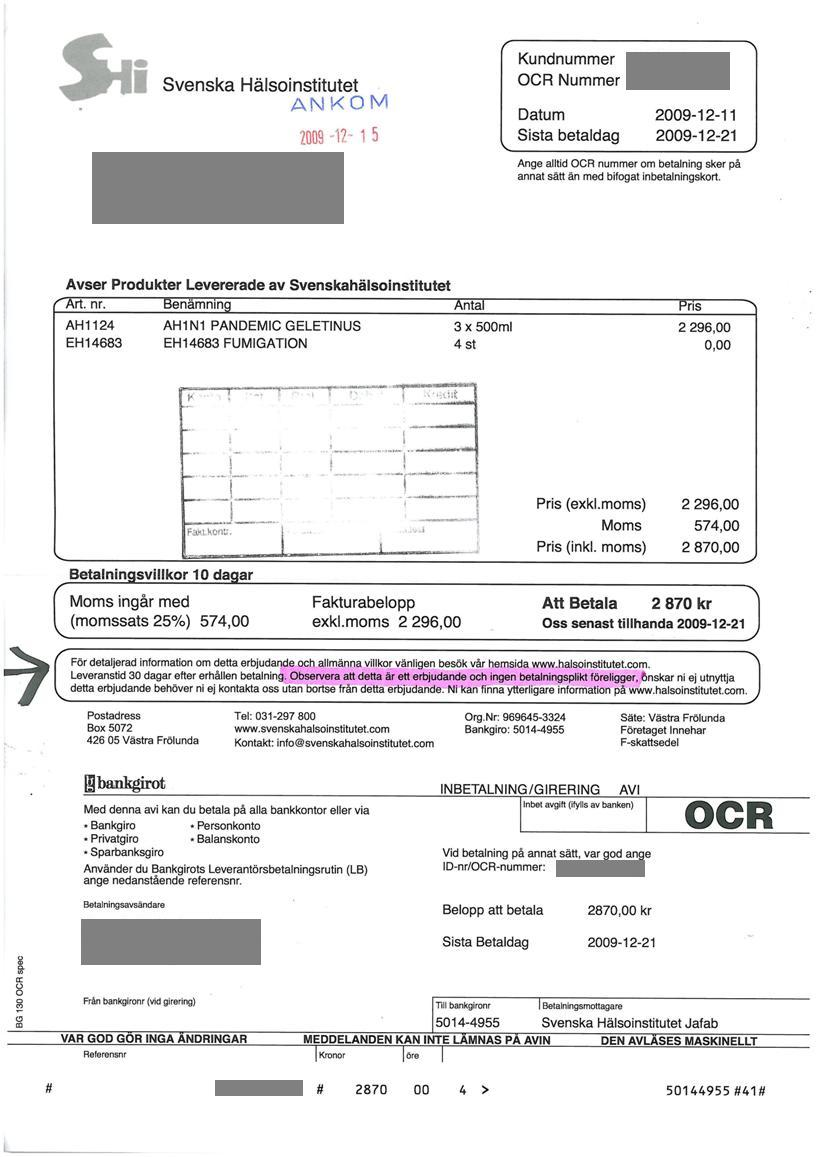
A false invoice (SEK 2870/USD 400), sent to a company in Sweden, looking like ordinary invoices in Sweden. Payment within 10 days. In order to avoid prosecution there is a fine pitch text "this is an offer and does not need to be paid", in this image marked purple. Such false invoices are sent in fairly large number in Sweden

False billing, also known as fraudulent billing or billing fraud, is a fraudulent act of invoicing or otherwise requesting funds from an individual or firm without showing obligation to pay. This could be fraudulent billing for part of the work done (over-billing with the intent to defraud), or that no work was done at all.

Such notices are, for example, sent to owners of domain names, goods and/ or services not provided, or purporting to be legitimate renewal notices, although not originating from the owner's own registrar. Other examples are overbilling and fraudulently adding fake fees and taxes (see below).

== Attorney bills ==
According to the American Bar Association rules governing lawyer's ethics, a false bill, invoice, or statement, this would be a misrepresentation that could result in sanctions. An attorney has a fiduciary duty under Rule 1.1 to their client of competent representation, and competence with billing is part of that. The lawyer has a specific duty under Rule 1.4 (b) to explain matters in order for them to make needed and informed choices about their lawyer's work. There are many more specific requirements under ABA Rule 1.5, Fees, for example, the bill must be "reasonable", which has been defined in great detail since 2014.

If a false bill is sent to a third party to pay, it would violate Rule 4.1, "Truthfulness In Statements To Others ... Misrepresentation."

False billing has become a serious problem, according to the ABA Journal, whereby big law firms allegedly overbill clients. By comparison, over-billing by small law firms is less likely; many small businesses tend to under-bill for a variety of reasons.

== Notable examples ==
- Akorn#History
- Booz Allen Hamilton#Procurement fraud settlement
- Drug rehabilitation#Criticism
- Dubin v. United States
- Federal District Metro (Brazil)
- Fontainebleau Las Vegas#Financial issues:_2009
- Lumen Technologies
- Operation LabScam
- Oswego Community Hospital
- Prem Reddy#Controversy and Prime Healthcare Services#Controversies
- Rick Scott
- RKO General
- Sumitomo Heavy Industries#History
- Toronto Community Housing#2013 Fraudulent billing
- Maryanne Trump Barry#Allegations of tax evasion
