= National Credentialing Agency for Laboratory Personnel =

Professional association in the United States

The National Credentialing Agency for Laboratory Personnel (NCA) was a professional association for medical laboratory professionals.

It was founded 1978 by members of American Society for Clinical Laboratory Science to enable members of the medical laboratory profession to control the certification process. It was previously known by the full acronym NACMLP.

In 2009, NCA was acquired by American Society for Clinical Pathology (ASCP) to form a single certifying agency, the ASCP Board of Certification. People who had an NCA certification were transferred to the Board of Certification, without needing to sit any additional examinations.

== Certifications ==
The following certifications were offered and accredited by the National Commission for Certifying Agencies (NCCA).

Name	Abbr.	Notes
Clinical Laboratory Specialist in Cytogenetics	CLSp(CG)	
Certified Laboratory Specialist in Molecular Biology	CLSp(MB)	
Phlebotomy	CLPlb	
Clinical Laboratory Technician	CLT	
Clinical Laboratory Scientist	CLS	
Clinical Laboratory Director	CLDir	
Clinical Laboratory Supervisor	CLSup	
CLS Categorical in Chemistry		
CLS Categorical in Hematology		
CLS Categorical in Immunohematology		
CLS Categorical in Microbiology		
