= Academy of Clinical Laboratory Physicians and Scientists =

Learned society

- Abbreviation: ACLPS
- Formation: November 12, 1966; 59 years ago
- Founders: David Seligson, Jon Straumfjord, George Z. Williams, Ernest Cotlove, and Ellis Benson
- Founded at: Bethesda, Maryland
- Type: Learned society
- Region served: North America
- Fields: Clinical pathology
- Members: 295 (2015)
- President: Neal Lindeman
- President-Elect: J. Stacey Klutts
- Website: www.aclps.org

The Academy of Clinical Laboratory Physicians and Scientists is a learned society for scientists in the fields of clinical pathology and laboratory medicine. It was founded on November 12, 1966, in Bethesda, Maryland by a group of fifty-one individuals, led by David Seligson, Jon Straumfjord, George Z. Williams, Ernest Cotlove, and Ellis Benson. The society's founding mission was to represent scientists in the fields of clinical pathology and laboratory medicine in both the United States and Canada. As of 2015, it had 295 active members, as well as an additional 127 associate members, 195 emeritus members, and 5 honorary members. Along with the American Society for Clinical Pathology, it co-sponsors the American Journal of Clinical Pathology.
