= American Journal of Clinical Pathology =

Academic journal

- Discipline: Clinical pathology
- Language: English
- Edited by: Steven H. Kroft

Publication details
- History: 1931–present
- Publisher: Oxford University Press
- Frequency: Monthly
- Impact factor: 2.493 (2020)

Standard abbreviations
- ISO 4: Am. J. Clin. Pathol.

Indexing
- CODEN: AJCPAI
- ISSN: 0002-9173 (print); 1943-7722 (web)
- LCCN: sv89091833
- OCLC no.: 715427025

Links
- Journal homepage; Online archive

The American Journal of Clinical Pathology is a monthly peer-reviewed medical journal covering clinical pathology. It was established in 1931 and is published by Oxford University Press. It is the official journal of the American Society for Clinical Pathology and the Academy of Clinical Laboratory Physicians and Scientists. The editor-in-chief is Steven H. Kroft (Medical College of Wisconsin). According to the Journal Citation Reports, the journal has a 2020 impact factor of 2.493.
