= American Society for Clinical Laboratory Science =

Professional organization in the United States

American Society for Clinical Laboratory Science or (ASCLS) is a professional organization that provides advocacy, standards setting, education (professional and continuing), personal and professional development for clinical laboratory science practitioners.

ASCLS began in 1933 as the American Society of Clinical Laboratory Technicians(ASCLT), in 1936 was renamed to the American Society of Medical Technologists and in 1973 to the American Society for Medical Technology (ASMT), before settling on the current name American Society for Clinical Laboratory Science in 1993.

== History ==
The professional association began as the American Society for Medical Technology (ASMT) and is now known as the American Society for Clinical Laboratory Science (ASCLS). ASMT was organized in 1933 and incorporated in 1936. Early on, members were required to be certified by the Board of Registry (now the Board of Certification) of the American Society of Clinical Pathologists (ASCP) to ensure credibility of the society.

During the 1930s, ASMT activities included the inception of a journal, the establishment of a Constitution and Bylaws, the emergence of state charters, and educating the public about the profession. In 1947, ASMT held its first independent convention, compared to earlier national meetings which were held in conjunction with physician groups. During the 1950s, the ASMT Research Fund was established to advance research efforts. In 1962, qualifications for the clinical laboratory scientist (medical technologist) changed to include a baccalaureate degree and a new category of laboratory technician emerged. Also in the 1960s, ASMT joined the International Association of Medical Laboratory Technologists.

In the 1970s ASMT grew considerably in numbers (over 30,000 in 1976). The Professional Acknowledgment for Continuing Education (PACE) Program for validating and documenting continuing education was introduced, and the National Accrediting Agency for Clinical Laboratory Sciences (NAACLS) was formed as an independent accreditation agency. Together with Central Michigan University, ASMT provided graduate programs for laboratorians to earn master's degrees in administration or education. The ASMT launched its Future Directions Plan, and Statements of Competence. ASMT initiated the formation of the National Certification Agency (NCA) to advance "certification for the profession, by the profession."

In the 1980s, the organization sponsored the Clinical Laboratory Educators Conference (CLEC) and the Legislative Symposium. ASMT also moved its offices from Houston, Texas, to Washington, D.C., to become more involved in influencing legislation to advance the profession.

During the 1990s, ASMT changed its name to ASCLS and joined forces with the American Association for Clinical Chemistry (AACC) to hold one of the largest annual meetings of laboratorians in the country. In 1995, the National Labor Relations Board recognized medical technologists among its "professional employees."
