= Jones & Bartlett Learning =

Scholarly publisher

- Parent company: Ascend Learning
- Founded: 1983
- Founder: Donald W. Jones; Arthur Bartlett
- Country of origin: United States
- Headquarters location: Burlington, Massachusetts
- Publication types: Books
- Nonfiction topics: Educational & Professional Publishing
- Imprints: Informed (quick reference); Tarascon (medical)
- Revenue: US$84 million (2007)
- Official website: jblearning.com

Jones & Bartlett Learning, a division of Ascend Learning, is a scholarly publisher. The name comes from Donald W. Jones, the company's founder, and Arthur Bartlett, the first editor.

== History ==
In 1988, the company was named by New England Business Magazine as one of the 100 fastest-growing companies in New England. In 1989, they opened their first office in London. In 1993, they opened an office in Singapore, and an office in Toronto in 1994. Their corporate headquarters moved to Sudbury, Massachusetts in 1995. In 2011, Jones & Bartlett Learning moved its offices in Sudbury and Maynard, Massachusetts to Burlington, Massachusetts, sharing a building with other Ascend Learning corporate offices.

== See also ==
- National Healthcareer Association
