= American Society for Cytotechnology =

Professional organization

Founded in 1979, the American Society for Cytotechnology is a professional organization dedicated to the field of cytotechnology. The ASCT promotes cytotechnology through the development of practice standards, and by staying up to date regarding emerging technologies and the legislative and regulatory issues within the field. As well, the Society offers Cytotechnology related educational opportunities.
