= Cytotechnology =

Microscopic interpretation of cells to detect cancer and other abnormalities

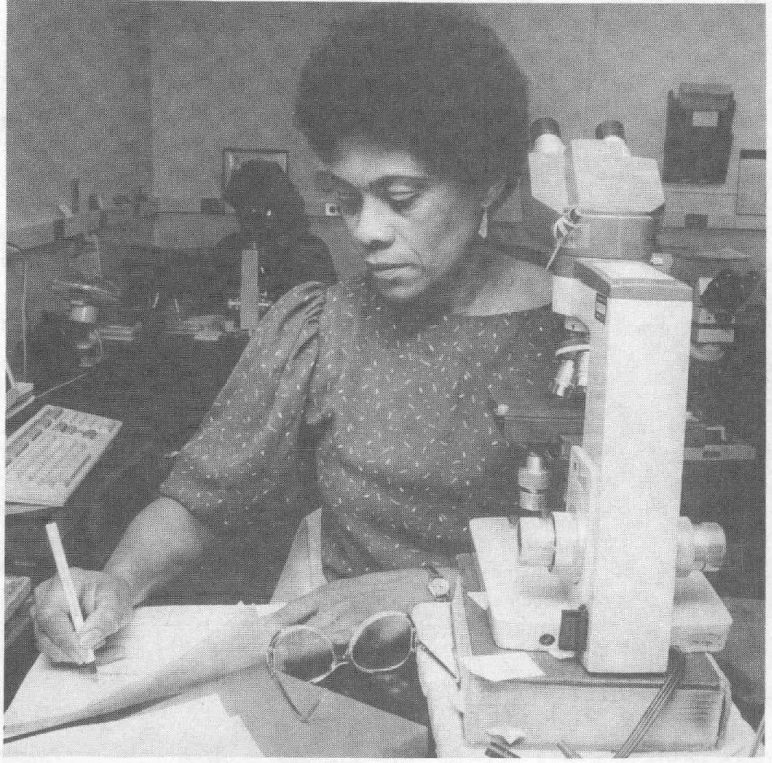
A cytotechnologist at work (1992).

Cytotechnology is the microscopic interpretation of cells to detect cancer and other abnormalities. This includes the examination of samples collected from the uterine cervix (Pap test), lung, gastrointestinal tract, or body cavities. A cytotechnologist is an allied health professional trained to evaluate specimens on glass slides using microscopes.

Two evaluations can be performed, starting with the initial evaluation, which can be performed by a computer, and points out areas that may be of particular interest for later examination. Then, the cytotechnologist performs a secondary evaluation and determines whether a specimen is normal or abnormal. Abnormal specimens are referred to a pathologist for final interpretation or medical diagnosis.

Much like with other medical fields, a cytotechnologist's work must be completed with high fidelity and must be interpreted properly. The working relationship between the cytotechnologist and the pathologist provides quality control for their work. Discussions between the two and the severity of their disagreements are used as a measurement for quality assurance. For example, when a cytotechnologist is working to construct a tissue microarray (TMA), they must check in with the supervising pathologist at multiple points in the process. The pathologist must first work with the cytotechnologist to make sure they know what to look for in the selection process and then review any selection that the cytotechnologist has concerns about.

Different countries have different certification requirements and standards for cytotechnologists. In the United States, there are currently two routes for certification: a person can first earn a bachelor's degree and then attend an accredited program in cytotechnology for one year, or they can attend a cytotechnology program that also awards a bachelor's degree. After successful completion of either route, the individual becomes eligible to take a certification exam offered by the American Society for Clinical Pathology (ASCP). People who complete the requirements and pass the examination are entitled to designate themselves as "CT (ASCP)". People who reside outside the United States have the option to take the certification exam for the ASCP^{i} instead. They must complete all requirements to be eligible, and upon successful completion, can practice in the USA. The American Society for Cytotechnology (ASCT) sets U.S. professional standards, monitors legislative and regulatory issues, and provides education. Individual states regulate the licensure of cytotechnologists, usually following American Society of Cytopathology (ASC) guidelines. Other countries have their own versions of the ASCT, including the British Association of Cytopathology (BAC) in the UK and the European Federation of Cytology Societies (EFCS) in the EU.

The ASC is for cytopathologists, but certain qualified cytotechnologists can join it as well.

== History ==
ASCP certified the first cytotechnologist in 1957. In the 1970s, the number of schools peaked at 130, before dropping to 32 in 2011.

== See also ==
- Gynaecologic cytology
- Cytopathology
