= Marcia C. Inhorn =

American medical anthropologist

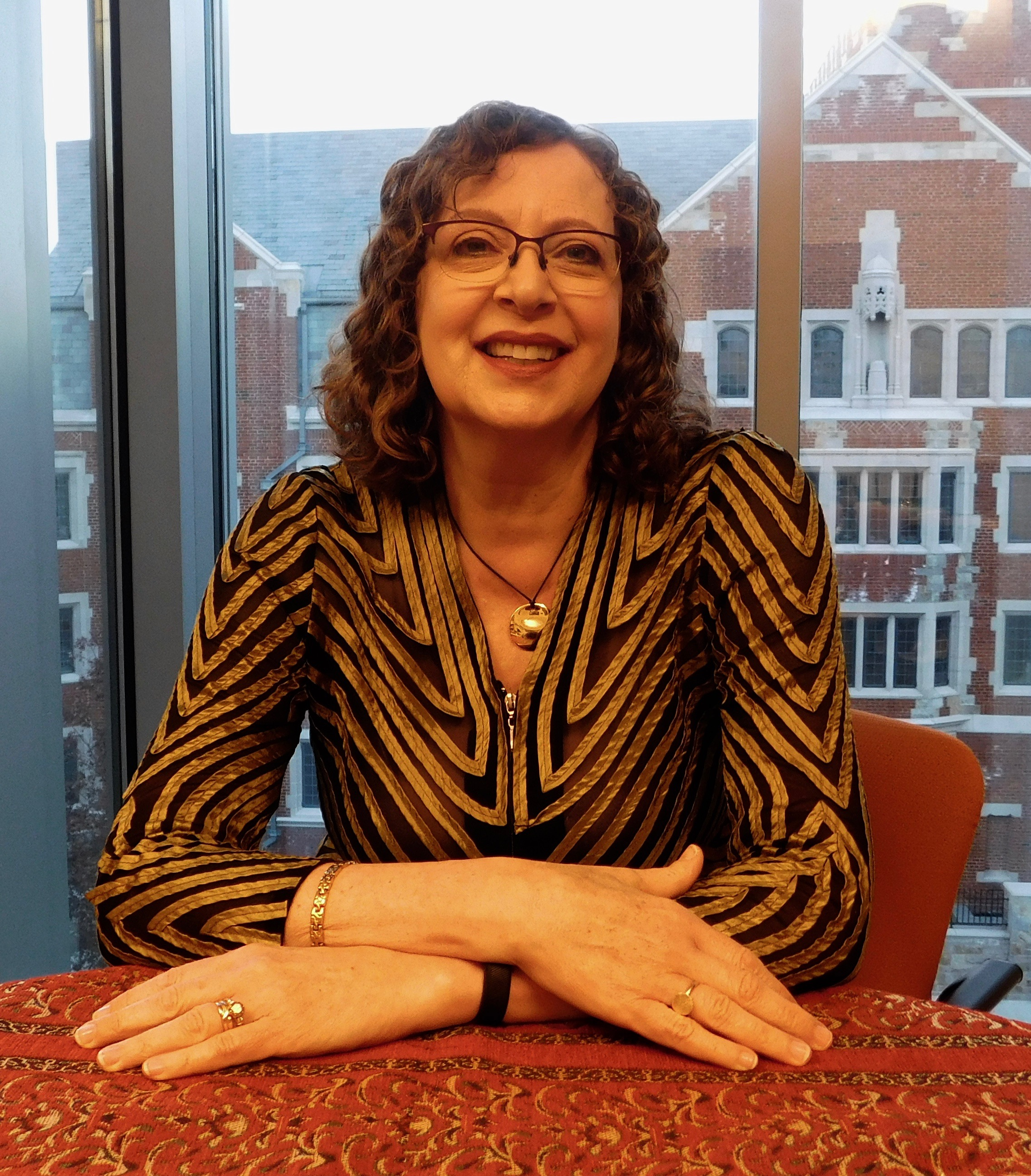
- Inhorn at Yale.
- Born: 1957 (age 68–69)
- Education: PhD, MPH
- Alma mater: UC Berkeley
- Employer(s): Yale University; University of Michigan
- Title: William K. Lanman Jr. professor
- Board member of: Elected Fellow, Society for Applied Anthropology, American Anthropological Association, 2007. Chair, Council on Middle East Studies, Yale University, 2008 - 2011. 2019- present. Founding Editor, Journal of Middle East Women's Studies
- Spouse: Kirk Hooks
- Children: Carl & Justine
- Awards: Robert B. Textor and Family Prize for Excellence in Middle East Anthropology, 2015. JMEWS Book Award for The New Arab Man: Emergent Masculinities, Technologies, and Islam in the Middle East, Association of Middle East Women's Studies, Middle East Studies Association, 2014 Diana Forsythe Prize for Outstanding Feminist Anthropological Research on Work, Science, and Technology, 2007. Eileen Basker Prize award for Quest for Conception: Gender, Infertility, and Egyptian Medical Traditions.
- Website: marciainhorn.com

Marcia Claire Inhorn is a medical anthropologist and William K. Lanman Jr. Professor of Anthropology and International Affairs at Yale University where she is Chair of the Council on Middle East Studies. A specialist on Middle Eastern gender and health issues, Inhorn conducts research on the social impact of infertility and assisted reproductive technologies in Egypt, Lebanon, the United Arab Emirates, and Arab America. She has also completed a major study of egg freezing in the United States, described in her book Motherhood on Ice: The Mating Gap and Why Women Freeze Their Eggs. Inhorn has published 21 books and more than 200 articles and book chapters.

Before joining the Yale faculty in 2008, Inhorn was a professor of medical anthropology at the University of Michigan and director of the Center for Middle Eastern and North African Studies. Inhorn was president of the Society for Medical Anthropology of the American Anthropological Association.

== Research ==
=== Egypt ===
Inhorn's works within feminist science and technology studies (STS), Middle East gender studies (including masculinity studies), and the anthropology of reproduction. She was the first anthropologist to study infertility and assisted reproductive technologies (ARTs) outside of the West, following the globalization of IVF to Egypt. Working in Egypt during the late 1980s and throughout the 1990s, she was able to document the significant social, religious, kinship, and gender ramifications of infertility and its treatment, as well as the impact that IVF had on both the medical system and gender relations in the country. In the decade between 1993 and 2003, she published three books called Quest for Conception (1994), Infertility and Patriarchy (1996), and Local Babies, Global Science (2003). These books could be described, respectively, as a classic medical anthropological ethnography, a gender studies ethnography, and an STS ethnography of the globalization of IVF into the Muslim Middle East.

Throughout these volumes, Inhorn charts Egyptian social and cultural understandings of infertility as a problem of personhood, marriage, kinship, and community life, while explaining how treatment options such as IVF are fundamentally shaped by local religious moralities. In the final book, based on research in Cairo's IVF clinics, she argues that numerous "arenas of constraint" — social, structural, ideological, and practical — limit and sometimes curtail access to IVF, even among elite Egyptian couples who engage in transnational quests to create a "baby of the tubes." These books have won several medical anthropology and feminist awards, including the American Anthropological Association's Diana Forsythe Prize for outstanding feminist anthropological research on work, science, technology, and biomedicine, and the Society for Medical Anthropology's Eileen Basker Memorial Prize for the most significant contribution to anthropological scholarship on gender and health.

=== Lebanon ===
Since 2003, Inhorn has undertaken three Middle Eastern research projects outside of Egypt. All have been funded by the National Science Foundation's Cultural Anthropology and Science, Technology, and Society programs, as well as the U.S. Department of Education's Fulbright-Hays Faculty Research Abroad program. Her book, The New Arab Man: Emergent Masculinities, Technologies, and Islam in the Middle East (Princeton University Press, 2012), is the culmination of one of these projects, based in Lebanon, and reflects her intellectual engagements in Middle East gender studies. Indeed, The New Arab Man is the first anthropological ethnography devoted to the exploration of Arab masculinity in the 21st century. It is also the only book focusing on male infertility and men's uses of intracytoplasmic sperm injection (ICSI), a variant of IVF designed to overcome this "hidden" male reproductive health problem. In The New Arab Man, Inhorn interrogates Raewyn Connell's theory of "hegemonic masculinity," suggesting that this concept, when applied to the Middle East, only serves to reinforce static dualisms and neo-Orientalist stereotypes. Inspired by the work of Raymond Williams, she offers a new concept of "emergent masculinities" as a way to encapsulate change over the male life course, between generations, and throughout social history, as men enact transformative events such as the 2011 Arab uprisings. As Inhorn argues in this book, many Middle Eastern men today are engaged in a self-conscious critique of local gender norms, attempting to unseat forms of patriarchy in the process. These men, who perhaps represent the "silent majority," share their hopes, dreams, and desires in the book, which is filled with ethnographic stories of men's lives, often in conflict-ridden settings. The New Arab Man based on research conducted with more than 300 Arab men, including Sunni and Shia Muslims, Christians, and Druze, from nearly a dozen Middle Eastern countries. The New Arab Man received the 2014 JMEWS Book Award from the Association of Middle East Women's Studies. In 2015, it received the 2015 Robert B. Textor and Family Prize for Excellence in Anticipatory Anthropology, an award given annually by the American Anthropological Association.

=== United Arab Emirates ===
Middle East's most "global city" and a new medical tourism hub. Her book Cosmopolitan Conceptions: IVF Sojourns in Global Dubai (Duke University Press, 2015), explores the stories of infertile couples from fifty countries and five continents, all of whom have attempted to seek assisted conception in Dubai's emergent IVF sector. The increasing global magnitude of travel to new cosmopolitan "reprohubs" such as Dubai is a reflection of the fact that IVF services are either absent, inaccessible, illegal, expensive, or harmful in many of the world's nations, particularly in the global South. As the first ethnographic study of so-called "reproductive tourism," Cosmopolitan Conceptions challenges this term as an inappropriate descriptor for couples' painful and tortuous IVF journeys across international borders. Instead, Cosmopolitan Conceptions adopts the term "reprotravel" to represent these journeys—part of a new conceptual "reprolexicon" introduced in the book and inspired by recent developments in globalization theory. Cosmopolitan Conceptions ends with an activist agenda, arguing for alternative pathways to parenthood; support for the infertile, especially infertile women; and provision of safe, low-cost IVF services, particularly in the global South.

=== Arab America ===
Inhorn's most recent book is America's Arab Refugees: Vulnerability and Health on the Margins (Stanford University Press, 2018), based on a five-year ethnographic study carried out in "Arab Detroit," Michigan, the so-called "capital" of Arab America. Set against the backdrop of America's stratified healthcare system and Detroit's status as the poorest big city in America, America's Arab Refugees provides the first in-depth analysis of the post-war health problems and struggles of infertile Arab refugees as they attempt to make new lives and new families in America. Forwarding the concept of "reproductive exile," Inhorn examines the ways in which Arab refugees, particularly from the country of Iraq, have been made infertile by the toxic legacies of American military intervention. Yet, after being forced to flee, they are exiled from America's costly healthcare system by poverty and reproductive racism. The book also interrogates the widespread anti-Arab/anti-Muslim sentiment that has been felt in the United States since 9/11, but that has been significantly exacerbated by the contemporary political climate and imposition of the "Muslim ban." To examine these new forms of racism, America's Arab Refugees draws inspiration from intersectionality theory as developed by US Black feminist scholars. One chapter of the book compares the interlocking and multiplicative forms of discrimination faced by both Arab and Black populations living side by side on the margins of Detroit. America's Arab Refugees thus represents the first attempt to apply intersectionality theory to the study of Arab lives in the US, showing that this theoretical approach has great utility in interrogating axes of oppression among marginalized immigrant and refugee communities. Ultimately, Inhorn's book interrogates the health costs of war, the health inequities and structural vulnerabilities faced by Muslim refugees in this country, and the US government's moral duty to assist those whose lives it has destroyed through its ongoing wars in the Middle East.

=== United States ===
Inhorn's most recent scholarly project is based solely in the US and supported by the US National Science Foundation. It focuses on oocyte cryopreservation (egg freezing), which is increasingly being used by women around the world to preserve and extend their fertility. Experimentally developed for women facing medical conditions such as cancer, the technology has moved into IVF clinics since 2012, where it is being used by otherwise healthy women. Although most of the feminist and media commentary about egg freezing focuses on women's career ambitions, in-depth interviews show a quite different story about women's motivations and experiences. Inhorn's ethnographic research with 150 women who froze their eggs shows that egg freezing is largely about partnership problems among highly educated professional women who are hoping for the "three P's" of partnership, pregnancy, and parenthood. However, these women lack the "three E's"—namely, men who are eligible, educated, and equal. This "mating gap" reflects growing but little-discussed gender imbalances in higher education, not only in America, but in more than 60 percent of the world's nations. Educated women's inability to form stable reproductive relationships is leading to the global egg freezing turn. Inhorn's study has been featured in multiple media outlets, including NPR, CNN, The New York Times, The New Yorker, The Guardian, The Atlantic, The Washington Post, the Huffington Post, and Jezebel. Inhorn has also appeared in multiple podcasts, radio talk shows, and documentary films, such as Netflix's "Explained" feature on "Fertility."

== Editorships ==
Inhorn is the founding editor of the Journal of Middle East Women's Studies (JMEWS). She is also Co-Editor in Chief of Reproductive BioMedicine and Society, Associate editor for population and health of the journal Global Public Health, and Co-editor of the "Fertility, Reproduction, and Sexuality" series at Berghahn Books. She is also editor or co-editor of fourteen volumes on medical anthropology, gender, reproduction, and the Middle East.

== Publications ==
=== Books ===
- Inhorn, Marcia C. (2023). Motherhood on Ice: The Mating Gap and Why Women Freeze Their Eggs. New York: NYU Press.
- Inhorn, Marcia C. (2018). America's Arab Refugees: Vulnerability and Health on the Margins. Stanford, CA: Stanford University Press.
- Inhorn, Marcia C. (2015). Cosmopolitan Conceptions: IVF Sojourns in Global Dubai. Duke University Press.
- Inhorn, Marcia C. (2012). The New Arab Man: Emergent Masculinities, Technologies, and Islam in the Middle East. Princeton, NJ: Princeton University Press. ISBN 9780691148892.
- Inhorn, Marcia C. (2003). Local Babies, Global Science: Gender, Religion, and In Vitro Fertilization in Egypt. New York: Routledge. ISBN 978-0-415-94417-5.. Winner of the Diana Forsythe Prize for Outstanding Feminist Anthropological Research on Work, Science, and Technology, including Biomedicine; Society for the Anthropology of Work and The Committee on the Anthropology of Science, Technology, and Computing (CASTAC), American Anthropological Association, 2007
- Inhorn, Marcia C. (1996). Infertility and Patriarchy: the Cultural Politics of Gender and Family Life in Egypt. Philadelphia: University of Pennsylvania Press. ISBN 978-0-8122-1424-6.
- Inhorn, Marcia C. (1994). Quest for Conception: Gender, Infertility, and Egyptian Medical Traditions. Philadelphia: University of Pennsylvania Press. ISBN 978-0-8122-1528-1.. Winner of the Eileen Basker Prize for Outstanding Research on Gender and Health, Society for Medical Anthropology, American Anthropological Association, 1995.

=== Edited volumes ===
- Franklin, Sarah B.; Inhorn, Marcia C. (2025) The New Reproductive Order: Technology, Fertility, and Social Change around the Globe. New York, NY: NYU Press, in press.
- Isidoros, Konstantina; Inhorn, Marcia C. (2022) Arab Masculinities: Anthropological Reconceptions in Precarious Times. Bloomington: Indiana University Press.
- Inhorn, Marcia C.; Volk, Lucia Volk, (2021) Un-Settling Middle Eastern Refugees: Regimes of Exclusion and Inclusion in the Middle East, Europe, and North America. New York, NY: Berghahn.
- Inhorn, Marcia C.; Smith-Hefner, Nancy. (2021) Waithood: Gender, Education, and Global Delays in Marriage and Childbearing. New York, NY: Berghahn Books.
- Inhorn, Marcia C.; Naguib, Nefissa (2018). Reconceiving Muslim Men: Love and Marriage, Family and Care in Precarious Times. New York, NY: Berghahn Books. ISBN 978-1-78533-882-3
- Inhorn, Marcia C.; Chavkin, Wendy; Navarro, Alberto-Jose (2014). Globalized Fatherhood. Fertility, Reproduction, and Sexuality Series. New York, NY: Berghahn Books. ISBN 978-1785333408.
- Inhorn, Marcia C.; Wentzell, Emily A (2012). Medical Anthropology at the Intersections: Histories, Activisms, and Futures. Durham, NC: Duke University Press. ISBN 978-0822352709.
- Inhorn, Marcia C.; Tremayne, Soraya (2012). Islam and Assisted Reproductive Technologies: Sunni and Shia Perspectives. New York: Berghahn Books. ISBN 978-0857454904.
- Inhorn, Marcia C.; Birenbaum-Carmeli, Daphna (2009). Assisting Reproduction, Testing Genes: Global Encounters With New Biotechnologies (Fertility, Reproduction and Sexuality). New York: Berghahn Books. ISBN 978-1-84545-625-2.
- Inhorn, Marcia C.; Tjornhoj-Thomsen, Tine; Goldberg, Helene; Maruska La Cour Mosegaard (2009). Reconceiving the Second Sex: Men, Masculinity, and Reproduction (Fertility, Reproduction and Sexuality). Providence: Berghahn Books. ISBN 978-1-84545-472-2.
- Hahn, Robert A.; Marcia C. Inhorn; eds. (2009). Anthropology and Public Health: Bridging Differences in Culture and Society. Oxford [Oxfordshire]: Oxford University Press. ISBN 978-0-19-537464-3
- Inhorn, Marcia C. (2007). Reproductive Disruptions: Gender, Technology, and Biopolitics in the New Millennium (Fertility, Reproduction and Sexuality). New York: Berghahn Books. ISBN 978-1-84545-406-7.
- Inhorn, Marcia C.; Balen, Frank van (2002). Infertility Around the Globe: New Thinking on Childlessness, Gender, and Reproductive Technologies. Berkeley: University of California Press. ISBN 978-0-520-23137-5.
- Inhorn, Marcia C.; Balen, Frank van; ed. (2002). Infertility Around the Globe: New Thinking on Childlessness, Gender, and Reproductive Technologies. Berkeley: University of California Press. ISBN 978-0-520-23137-5 (Winner of Council on Anthropology and Reproduction, Society for Medical Anthropology, Book Prize for "Most Notable Recent Edited Collection").
- Inhorn, Marcia C.; Brown, Peter G. (1997). The Anthropology of Infectious Disease: International Health Perspectives. New York: Gordon and Breach. ISBN 978-90-5699-556-0.

=== Selected book chapters ===
- Inhorn, Marcia C. (2023) "Medical Cosmopolitanism in Moral Worlds: Aspirations and Stratifications in Global Quests for Conception." Invited Chapter in Arc of Interference: Medical Anthropology for Worlds on Edge, eds. Joao Biehl and Vincanne Adams, pp. 187–209. Durham, NC: Duke University Press.
- Inhorn, Marcia C. (2021) "Gender, Sperm Troubles, and Assisted Reproductive Technologies." Why Gender?, ed. Jude Browne, pp. 126–143. Cambridge, UK: Cambridge University Press.
- Inhorn, Marcia C. (2021) "America's Wars and Iraqis' Lives: Refugee Vulnerabilities and Regimes of Exclusion in the United States." In Un-Settling Middle Eastern Refugees: Regimes of Exclusion and Inclusion in the Middle East, Europe, and North America. Eds. Marcia C. Inhorn and Lucia Volk, pp. 163–179. New York: Berghahn Books.
- Inhorn, Marcia C. (2021) "Egg Freezing Activists: Extending Reproductive Futures to Cancer Patients, Single and Minority Women, and Transgender Men in America." In Birthing Techno-Sapiens: Human-Technology Co-Evolution and the Future of Reproduction, ed. Robbie Davis-Floyd, pp. 47–59. New York: Routledge.
- Inhorn, Marcia C. (2020) "Two ‘Quiet' Reproductive Revolutions: Islam, Gender, and Fertility." In Routledge Handbook of Islam and Gender, ed. Justine Howe, pp. 343–357. New York: Routledge.
- Inhorn, Marcia C. (2020) "The Feminist Ethnography of Untested Assumptions: Traveling with IVF across the Middle East." In Gender, Considered: Feminist Reflections Across the Social Sciences, eds. Sarah Fenstermaker and Abigail Stewart, pp. 297–332. New York: Palgrave MacMillan.
- Mazzarino, Andrea, Marcia C. Inhorn, and Catherine Lutz (2019) "Introduction: The Health Consequences of War." In War and Health: The Medical Consequences of the Wars in Iraq and Afghanistan, eds. Catherine Lutz and Andrea Mazzarino, pp. 1–37. New York University Press.
- Inhorn, Marcia C., Daphna Birenbaum-Carmeli, Soraya Tremayne, and Zeynep B. Gurtin (2019) "Kinship and Assisted Reproductive Technologies: A Middle Eastern Comparison." In The Cambridge Handbook of Kinship, ed. Sandra Bamford, pp. 507–530. Cambridge, UK: Cambridge University Press.
- Inhorn, Marcia C. (2018) "Fertility, Demography, and Masculinities in Arab Families: From 1950 to 2015 and Beyond." Invited Chapter in Arab Family Studies: Critical Reviews, ed. Suad Joseph, pp. 449–466. Syracuse, NY: Syracuse University Press.
- Inhorn, Marcia C. (2017) "Wanted Babies, Excess Fetuses: The Middle East's In Vitro Fertilization, High-order Multiple Pregnancy, Fetal Reduction Nexus." In Abortion Pills, Test Tube Babies, and Sex Toys: Emerging Sexual and Reproductive Technologies in the Middle East and North Africa, eds. L. L. Wynn and Angel Foster, pp. 99–111. Nashville, TN: Vanderbilt University Press.
- Inhorn, Marcia C. (2016) "Multiculturalism in Muslim America? The Case of Health Disparities and Discrimination in "Arab Detroit," Michigan. Invited Chapter in New Horizons of Muslim Diaspora in North America and Europe, ed. Moha Ennaji, pp. 177–187. London: Palgrave MacMillan.
- Bharadwaj, Aditya, and Marcia C. Inhorn (2015) "Conceiving Life and Death: Stem Cell Technologies and Assisted Conception in India and the Middle East." In The Anthropology of Living and Dying, eds. Clara Han and Veena Das, pp. 67–82. New York: Wiley-Blackwell.
- Inhorn, Marcia C. (2014) "New Arab Fatherhood: Emergent Masculinities, Male Infertility, and Assisted Reproduction." In Globalized Fatherhood, eds. Marcia C. Inhorn, Wendy Chavkin, and Jose-Alberto Navarro, pp. 243–263. New York: Berghahn Books.
- Inhorn, Marcia C. (2012) "Diasporic Dreaming: Return Reproductive Tourism to the Middle East." In Transforming Ethnographic Knowledge, eds. Kamari Clarke and Rebecca Hardin, pp. 113–133. Madison: University of Wisconsin Press.
- Inhorn, Marcia. C., and Emily Wentzell (2012) "Medical Anthropology at the Intersections." In Medical Anthropology at the Intersections: Histories, Activisms, Futures, eds. Marcia C. Inhorn and Emily Wentzell, pp. 1–20. Durham: Duke University Press.
- Inhorn, Marcia C. (2012) "Globalization and Gametes: Reproductive Tourism, Islamic Bioethics, and Middle Eastern Modernity." In Reproductive Technologies as Global Form: Ethnographies of Knowledge, Practices, and Transnational Encounters, eds. WMichi Knecht, Maren Klotz, and Stefan Beck, Berlin: Campus Verlag.
- Inhorn, Marcia C. (2010) "'Assisted' Reproduction in Global Dubai: Reproductive Tourists and Their Helpers." In Globalized Motherhood, eds. Wendy Chavkin and JaneMaree Maher, pp. 180–202. New York: Routledge Press.
- Inhorn, Marcia C., and Daphna Birenbaum-Carmeli (2010) "Male Infertility, Chronicity, and the Plight of Palestinian Men in Israel and Lebanon," in Chronic Conditions, Fluid States: Globalization and the Anthropology of Illness, eds. Lenore Manderson and Carolyn Smith-Morris, pp. 77–95. New Brunswick, NJ: Rutgers University Press.
- Birenbaum-Carmeli, Daphna, and Marcia C. Inhorn (2009) "Introduction: Assisting Reproduction, Testing Genes: Global Encounters with New Biotechnologies." In Assisting Reproduction, Testing Genes: Global Encounters with New Biotechnologies, eds. Daphna Birenbaum-Carmeli and Marcia C. Inhorn, pp. 1–26. New York: Berghahn Books.
- Inhorn, Marcia C. (2009) "Middle Eastern Masculinities in the Age of Assisted Reproductive Technologies." In Assisting Reproduction, Testing Genes: Global Encounters with New Biotechnologies, eds. Daphna Birenbaum-Carmeli and Marcia C. Inhorn, pp. 86–110. New York: Berghahn Books.
- Inhorn, Marcia C., Tjørnhøj-Thomsen, Tine, Goldberg, Helene, and Maruska La Cour Mosegaard (2009)"Introduction—The Second Sex in Reproduction? Men, Sexuality, and Masculinity." In Reconceiving the Second Sex: Men, Masculinity, and Reproduction, eds. Marcia C. Inhorn, Tine Tjørnhøj-Thomsen, Helene Goldberg, and Maruska La Cour Mosegaard, pp. 1–17. New York: Berghahn Books.
- Inhorn, Marcia C., Rosario Ceballo, and Robert Nachtigall (2009) "Marginalized, Invisible, and Unwanted: American Minority Struggles with Infertility and Assisted Conception." In Ethnicity, Infertility and Reproductive Technologies, eds. Lorraine Culley, Nicky Hudson, and Floor B. van Rooij, pp. 181–197. London: Earthscan Books.
- Hahn, Robert A., and Marcia C. Inhorn (2009) "Introduction: Anthropology and Public Health." In Anthropology and Public Health: Bridging Differences in Culture and Society, eds. Robert A. Hahn and Marcia C. Inhorn, pp. 1–31. New York: Oxford University Press.
- Inhorn, Marcia C. (2007) "Loving Your Infertile Muslim Spouse: Notes on the Globalization of IVF and Its Romantic Commitments in Sunni Egypt and Shi'ite Lebanon." In Love and Globalization: Transformations of Intimacy in the Contemporary World, eds. Mark B. Padilla, Jennifer S. Hirsch, Miguel Munoz-Laboy, Robert Sember, and Richard G. Parker, pp. 139–160. Nashville, TN: Vanderbilt University Press. ISBN 978-0826515858
- Inhorn, Marcia C., and Aditya Bharadwaj. (2007) "Reproductively Disabled Lives: Infertility, Stigma, and Suffering in Egypt and India." Disability in Local and Global Worlds, eds. Benedicte Ingstad and Susan Reynolds Whyte, pp. 78–106. Berkeley: University of California Press.
- Inhorn, Marcia C. (2003) "The Risks of Test-tube Baby Making in Egypt." Risk, Culture, and Health Inequality: Shifting Perceptions of Danger and Blame, eds. Barbara Herr Harthorn and Laury Oaks, pp. 57–78. Westport, CT: Praeger.
- Van Balen, Frank, and Marcia C. Inhorn (2002) "Introduction—Interpreting Infertility: A View from the Social Sciences." In Infertility Around the Globe: New Thinking on Childlessness, Gender, and Reproductive Technologies, eds. Marcia C. Inhorn and Frank van Balen, pp. 3–23. Berkeley: University of California Press.
- Inhorn, Marcia C. (2002) "The ‘Local' Confronts the ‘Global': Infertile Bodies and New Reproductive Technologies in Egypt." In Infertility Around the Globe: New Thinking on Childlessness, Gender, and Reproductive Technologies, eds. Marcia C. Inhorn and Frank van Balen, pp. 263–282. Berkeley: University of California Press.

=== Selected journal articles ===
- Inhorn, Marcia C. (2022) "Fertility Decline, Small Families, and Son Selection in the Muslim World: The Controversial Convergence of Contraceptive and Reprogenetic Technologies." The Muslim World 112 (3): 324-339.
- Birenbaum-Carmeli, Daphna; Inhorn, Marcia C.; Vale, Mira; Patrizio, Pasquale. (2022) "Cryopreserving Jewish Motherhood: Egg Freezing in Israel and the United States." Medical Anthropology Quarterly 35 (3): 346-363.
- Inhorn, Marcia C.; Birenbaum-Carmeli, Daphna; Yu, Ruoxi; Patrizio, Pasquale. (2022) "Egg Freezing at the End of Romance: A Technology of Hope, Despair, and Repair." Science, Technology & Human Values 47 (1): 53-84.
- Birenbaum-Carmeli, Daphna; Inhorn, Marcia C.; Patrizio, Pasquale. (2021) "Transgender Men's Fertility Preservation: Motivations, Experiences, and Support." Culture, Health, and Sexuality 23 (7): 945-960.
- Inhorn, Marcia C.; Yu, Ruoxi; Patrizio, Pasquale. (2020) "Upholding Success: Asian Americans, Egg Freezing, and the Fertility Paradox." Medical Anthropology 40 (1): 3-19.
- Inhorn, Marcia C.; Birenbaum-Carmeli, Daphna; Vale, Mira; Patrizio, Pasquale. (2020) "Abrahamic Traditions and Egg Freezing: Religious Women's Experiences in Local Moral Worlds." Social Science and Medicine 253 doi.org/10.1016/j.socscimed.2020.112976
- Inhorn, Marcia C., Birenbaum-Carmeli, Daphna; Patrizio, Pasquale. (2020) "Elective Egg Freezing and Male Support: A Qualitative Study of Men's Hidden Roles in Women's Fertility Preservation." Human Fertility 25 (1): 99-106.
- Erten, Hatice Nilay; Inhorn, Marcia C. (2020) "Medical Anthropology in an Era of Authoritarianism." In "World Anthropologies," American Anthropologist 122 (2): 388-389.
- Inhorn, Marcia C. (2020) "Where Has the Quest for Conception Taken US? Lessons from Anthropology and Sociology." Reproductive BioMedicine and Society Online 10:46-57.
- Sadruddin, Aalyia Feroz Ali; Inhorn, Marcia C. (2020) "Aging, Vulnerability, and Questions of Care in the Time of COVID-19." Anthropology Now 12 (1):17-23
- Whittaker, Andrea; Inhorn, Marcia C.; Shenfield, Francoise. (2019) "Globalised Quests for Assisted Conception: Reproductive Travel for Infertility and Involuntary Childlessness." Global Public Health 14 (12):1669-1688.
- Inhorn, Marcia C. (2018) "Islam, Sex, and Sin: IVF Ethnography as Muslim Men's Confessional." Special Issue on Religions and Masculinities, William Dawley and Brendan Thornton, eds. Anthropology Quarterly 91 (1): 25-52.
- Inhorn, Marcia C. (2018) "Searching for Love and Test-tube Babies: Iraqi Refugee Men in Reproductive Exile on the Margins of Detroit." Special Issue on Translating Reproductive Desires and Disappointments, Linda Bennett, ed. Medical Anthropology 37 (2): 145-157.
- Inhorn, Marcia C. (2018). "The Arab World's 'Quiet' Reproductive Revolution". Brown Journal of World Affairs. 24: 147–157.
- Inhorn, Marcia C.; Tremayne, Soraya (2016). "Islam, Assisted Reproduction, and the Bioethical Aftermath". Journal of Social Affairs. 55 (2): 422–30. doi:10.1007/s10943-015-0151-1. PMID 26602421. S2CID 22446586.
- Inhorn, Marcia C.; Birenbaum-Carmeli, Daphna; Patrizio, Pasquale. (2017). "Medical Egg Freezing and Cancer Patients' Hopes: Fertility Preservation at the Intersection of Life and Death". Social Science & Medicine. 196: 25–33. doi:10.1016/j.socscimed.2017.10.031. PMID 29121511.
- Inhorn, Marcia C. (2016). "Medical Cosmopolitanism in Global Dubai: A 21st-Century Transnational Intracytoplasmic Sperm Injection (ICSI) Depot". Medical Anthropology Quarterly. 31 (1): 5–22. doi:10.1111/maq.12275. PMID 26756447.
- Inhorn, Marcia C.; Tremayne, Soraya (2016). "Islam, Assisted Reproduction, and the Bioethical Aftermath". Journal of Social Affairs. 55 (2): 422–30. doi:10.1007/s10943-015-0151-1. PMID 26602421. S2CID 22446586.
- Inhorn, Marcia C. (2014). "Roads Less Traveled in Middle East Anthropology—and New Paths in Gender Ethnography". Journal of Middle East Women's Studies. 10 (3): 62–86. doi:10.2979/jmiddeastwomstud.10.3.62. PMID 552283. S2CID 144678175.
- Inhorn, Marcia C. (2012). "Why Me? Male Infertility and Responsibility in the Middle East". Men and Masculinities. 16 (1): 49–70. doi:10.1177/1097184X12468098. S2CID 45332437.
- Inhorn, Marcia C. (2012). "Reproductive Exile in Global Dubai: South Asian Stories". Cultural Politics. 8 (2): 283–308. doi:10.1215/17432197-1575174. S2CID 48104803.
- Inhorn, Marcia C.; Patrizio, Pasquale; Serour, Gamal I. (2010). "Third-Party Reproductive Assistance Around the Mediterranean: Comparing Sunni Egypt, Catholic Italy, and Multisectarian Lebanon". Reproductive BioMedicine Online. 21 (7): 848–853. doi:10.1016/j.rbmo.2010.09.008. PMID 21050814.
- Inhorn, Marcia C. (2010). "Medical Anthropology at the Intersections: Celebrating 50 Years of Interdisciplinarity". Medical Anthropology Quarterly. 24 (2): 263–9. doi:10.1111/j.1548-1387.2010.01100.x.
- Inhorn, Marcia C.; Patrizio, Pasquale (2009). "Rethinking Reproductive 'Tourism' as Reproductive 'Exile'". Fertility and Sterility. 92 (3): 904–6. doi:10.1016/j.fertnstert.2009.01.055. PMID 19249025.
- Inhorn, Marcia C. (2009). "Right to Assisted Reproductive Technology: Overcoming Infertility in Low-resource Countries". International Journal of Gynecology and Obstetrics. 106 (2): 172–4. doi:10.1016/j.ijgo.2009.03.034. PMID 19539927.
- Inhorn, Marcia C. (2008). "Medical Anthropology Against War". Medical Anthropology Quarterly. 22 (4): 416–24. doi:10.1111/j.1548-1387.2008.00040.x. PMID 19189726.
- Inhorn, Marcia C.; Birenbaum-Carmeli, Daphna (2008). "Assisted Reproductive Technologies and Culture Change". Annual Review of Anthropology. 37: 177–196. doi:10.1146/annurev.anthro.37.081407.085230.
- Inhorn, Marcia C. (2007). "Masculinity, Reproduction, and Male Infertility Surgeries in Egypt and Lebanon". Journal of Middle East Women's Studies. 3 (3): 1–20. doi:10.2979/mew.2007.3.3.1.
- Inhorn, Marcia C.; Kobeissi, Loulou (2006). "The Public Health Costs of War in Iraq: Lessons from Post-War Lebanon". Journal of Social Affairs. 23: 13–47.
- Inhorn, Marcia C. (2006). "Making Muslim Babies: IVF and Gamete Donation in Sunni and Shi'a Islam". Culture, Medicine, and Psychiatry. 30 (4): 427–50. doi:10.1007/s11013-006-9027-x. PMC 1705533. PMID 17051430.
- Inhorn, Marcia C. (2006). "Defining Women's Health: A Dozen Messages from More than 150 Ethnographies". Medical Anthropology Quarterly. 20 (3): 345–78. doi:10.1525/maq.2006.20.3.345. PMID 16937621.
- Inhorn, Marcia C.; Fakih, Michael Hassan (2006). "Arab Americans, African Americans, and Infertility: Barriers to Reproduction and Medical Care". Fertility and Sterility. 85 (4): 844–52. doi:10.1016/j.fertnstert.2005.10.029. PMID 16580363.
