= Medical assistant =

Health care professional who performs routine clinical and administrative duties

A medical assistant, also known as a "clinical assistant" or healthcare assistant in the US, is an allied health professional who supports the work of physicians, nurse practitioners, physician assistants and other health professionals, usually in a clinic setting. Medical assistants can become certified through an accredited program. Medical assistants perform routine tasks and procedures in a medical clinic.

A "medical assistant" may be certified or registered, or may be a loosely defined group (covering related occupational titles such as "medical office assistant", "clinical assistant", "assistant medical officer", or "ophthalmic assistant"). The occupation should not be confused with physician assistants, who are licensed professionals trained to practice medicine and perform surgical procedures in collaboration with a physician.

== Overview ==
Medical assistants perform routine clinical and administrative duties under the direct supervision of a physician or other health care professional. Medical assistants perform many administrative duties, including answering telephones, greeting patients, updating and filing patients' medical records, filling out insurance forms, handling correspondence, scheduling appointments, arranging for hospital admission and laboratory services, performing some quasi-secretarial duties, and handling billing and book keeping. Duties vary according to laws of the jurisdiction and may include taking medical histories and recording vital signs, explaining treatment procedures to patients, preparing patients for examination, and assisting during diagnostic examinations. Medical assistants collect and prepare laboratory specimens or perform basic laboratory tests on the premises, dispose of contaminated supplies, and sterilize medical instruments. They instruct patients about medications and special diets, prepare and administer medications as directed, authorize drug refills as directed, telephone prescriptions to a pharmacy, draw blood, prepare patients for X-rays, take electrocardiograms, remove sutures, and change dressings. They also facilitate communication between the patient and other health care professionals.

Some jurisdictions allow medical assistants to perform more advanced procedures, such as giving injections or taking X-rays, after passing a test or taking a course.

According to the International Standard Classification of Occupations, medical assistants normally require formal training in health services provision for competent performance in their jobs. Formal education usually occurs in post secondary institutions such as vocational schools, technical institutes, community colleges, proprietary colleges, online educational programs or junior colleges. Medical assistant training programs most commonly lead to a certificate or a diploma, which take around one year to complete, or an associate degree, which takes around two years. Study topics include medical terminology, anatomy and physiology, and programs may include a clinical internship, sometimes referred to as "externship", wherein the student works as a medical assistant in a medical clinic.

== Bangladesh ==
In Bangladesh, medical assistants are known as Sub Assistant Community Medical Officer (SACMO).They complete Diploma in Medical Faculty (DMF) course of 4.5 years duration (4 years academic + 6 months internship) from The State Medical Faculty of Bangladesh. In this academic year they study Basic Anatomy, Basic Medicine and Paediatrics, Basic Surgery, Basic Gynecology and Obstetrics. According to the BMDC ACT 2010, they practice independently with 0 drugs. And in the govt hospital they work under a Medical officer (As an assistant to a doctor). They play an important role in providing medical services in upazila health complexes and remote areas. Medical assistants are produced by Medical Assistants Training School (MATS).They are allowed to assist doctor under the direct supervision of a physician. They get registration from Bangladesh Medical and Dental Council as a medical assistant not a doctor .

== Canada ==
In Canada, medical assistants typically complete an educational program that prepares them to perform special assisting and secretarial duties for physicians, dentists, nurses, health care facilities, and other health service providers. Instructional programs include courses in business and medical communications, medical terminology, principles of health care operations, public relations and interpersonal communications, software applications, record-keeping and filing systems, scheduling and meeting planning, policies and regulations, and professional standards and ethics.

Medical assistant job responsibilities vary depending on the nature and size of the health care facility where the individual works, but typically involve multiple administrative duties such as scheduling appointments, handling private medical documents, and assisting patients with the admissions process.

== Malaysia ==
In Malaysia, medical assistants are known as Assistant Medical Officers (AMO). They complete a three-and-a-half-year diploma in medical assistant (DMA) undergraduate program recognized by the Malaysian Qualifications Agency. They work independently or with limited supervision of a physician to provide healthcare services to largely underserved populations. The occupation is more similar to that of clinical officers in Tanzania and elsewhere.

== United States ==
In the United States, medical assistants have traditionally held jobs almost exclusively in ambulatory care centers, urgent care facilities, and clinics, but this is now changing. Medical assistants now find employment in both private and public hospitals, inpatient and outpatient facilities, as well as assisted living facilities, administrative and clinical settings, or general practice and specialty doctor's offices. According to the U.S. Department of Labor's Occupational Outlook Handbook, 2014–15 Edition, employment of medical assistants is expected to grow by 29%, much faster than the average for all occupations through 2022.

=== Education and training ===
The New America Foundation has criticized medical assistant programs, particularly those run by profit-making schools like Kaplan and Everest College. Some graduates of the school cannot find full-time work, or cannot find work at all, cannot make enough to pay their loans, and go into default. According to the Department of Labor, median annual salary for medical assistants in 2011 was $29,100, but students with medical-assistant certificates typically earned less than $20,000. In some programs, graduates earned less than $15,080, the minimum wage, which means they were working part-time. For example, Drake College of Business, Elizabeth, NJ, charges $18,000, but 31% of graduates defaulted on loans. A few public community colleges have successful programs where graduates make more than $25,000 a year. According to the US Bureau Of Labor Statistics the median average wage for medical assistants in 2024 is $44,200.

In the U.S., an institution's medical assisting program may be accredited by the Commission on Accreditation of Allied Health Education Programs (CAAHEP) or the Accrediting Bureau of Health Education Schools (ABHES) if its graduates plan to become certified or registered. Accreditation is a requirement of certification agencies such as the American Association of Medical Assistants (AAMA), the American Medical Technologists (AMT) and the National Health Career Association (NHA). Currently there are in excess of 600 CAAHEP accredited programs in more than 500 institutions, and more than 200 accredited by ABHES. Accreditation by CAAHEP, ABHES or other accreditation associations requires that the institution's medical assisting program meets specific educational standards and provides sufficient classroom, lecture, and laboratory time.

=== Certification ===
Professional certification is a way to measure competency of a medical assistant at an entry-level job. Certification for medical assistants is voluntary and optional, though encouraged by the American Association of Medical Assistants (AAMA) and a number of other certification bodies. Employers increasingly prefer or even require that the medical assistants they hire be certified.

In the United States, different organizations certify medical assistants. For one, the American Association of Medical Assistants (AAMA) was founded in 1956. Certification may be achieved by taking the CMA (AAMA) Certification Examination offered by the AAMA Certifying Board in consultation with the National Board of Medical Examiners, which also administers many national exams for physicians. The CMA (AAMA) exam is offered throughout the year at computer-based testing centers across the country. Only individuals who have successfully completed a CAAHEP or ABHES accredited medical assisting program are eligible for the CMA (AAMA) Certification Examination. Those who successfully complete the CMA (AAMA) Certification Examination earn the CMA (AAMA) credential, a title which then follows postnominally. A CMA (AAMA) must re-certify every 60 months by continuing education or re-examination in order to maintain certification.

Other credential options include becoming a registered medical assistant (RMA). Credentialing is voluntary. The American Medical Technologists (AMT) agency is responsible for certifying MAs who choose this course. The AMT first began offering this certification in 1972. AMT has its own conventions and committees, bylaws, state chapters, officers, registrations, and re validation examinations. To become eligible to hold the title of RMA, a student must either pass a medical assisting curriculum at a school that accredited by the National Commission for Certifying Agencies (NCCA), or possess a minimum of five years experience.

The National Center for Competency Testing (NCCT) is an independent credentialing organization that has administered more than 400,000 certification exams across the United States since 1989. Its National Certified Medical Assistant certification program has earned accreditation by the National Commission for Certifying Agencies (NCCA). Candidates who meet all medical assistant eligibility requirements and pass the NCCT national certification examination earn the credential NCMA (NCCT). NCCT accepts candidates from approved medical assistant programs in colleges/universities and provides additional experiential-based qualifying routes. Once certified, the NCMA (NCCT) must complete 14 clock hours of continuing education annually to maintain the credential.

== See also ==
- Assistant Medical Officer
- Hospital Corpsman
- Medical Assistant (Royal Navy)
