= American Society for Clinical Pathology =

Medical association

- Abbreviation: ASCP
- Type: Nonprofit
- Registration no.: 36-2406080
- Headquarters: Chicago
- Locations: Washington, DC; Indianapolis
- CEO: Alexandra Brown, MD, FASCP
- Revenue: US$32 million (2022)
- Expenses: US$29 million (2022)
- Website: www.ascp.org

The American Society for Clinical Pathology (ASCP), formerly known as the American Society of Clinical Pathologists, is a professional association based in Chicago, Illinois, encompassing 130,000 pathologists and laboratory professionals.

Founded in 1922, the ASCP provides programs in education, certification and advocacy on behalf of patients, pathologists and lab professionals. In addition, the ASCP publishes numerous textbooks, newsletters and other manuals, and publishes two industry journals: American Journal of Clinical Pathology (AJCP) and LabMedicine.

On August 10, 2026, Dr. Alexandra Brown, MD, FASCP, was named CEO.

== Acquisitions ==
In February 2006, ASCP acquired the cytology product line of the Midwest Institute for Medical Education (MIME). At the time, it was the only national cytology proficiency testing provider.

In 2009, ASCP acquired the medical technologist led National Credentialing Agency for Laboratory Personnel (NCA). The baccalaureate-level certification designations Medical Technologist (MT) and Clinical Laboratory Scientist (CLS) were replaced by Medical Laboratory Scientist, MLS(ASCP)^{CM}. The BOC Board of Governors will be composed of five ASCP Fellows (pathologists), five ASCP laboratory professionals, four representatives of ASCLS, two representatives of the Association of Genetic Technologists, eight representatives from the eight participating societies respectively, and one public representative. The acquisition was criticized by AMT as doing little to further the standing of laboratory professionals.

In 2021, ASCP acquired the Clinical Laboratory Management Association (CMLA). CMLA had advocated against laboratory personnel licensure as an unnecessary cost.

== Board of Registry (BOR) ==
[MT ASCP] is becoming increasingly important and will serve in to place trained laboratory technicians in a more secure competition with those whose training has been more superficial.

— Bureau of Laboratories, New Brunswick (1938)

The ASCP Board of Registry (BOR) was established in 1928 as the "Registration Bureau for Technicians" as the first certification agency for clinical laboratory personnel in the US. ASCP was the first professional medical organization to set standards for laboratory professionals, which initially only required a recommendation from a member. Those recommended were subsequently registered with ASCP, hence name the Board of Registry. In 1931, there were two classifications for registrants: Laboratory Technician (L.T.) and Medical Technologist (M.T.). The L.T. designation was granted to all technicians who met the minimum requirements without the examination. The M.T. designations was issued to applicants who met rigid requirement of the Board and were individually elected at each annual meeting. The first certification was issued in 1930 to Paul H. Adams of Fort Wayne, Indiana. In 1933, ASCP began to assess individuals for academic and clinical prerequisites, and those who passed a board examination were granted certification. The initial certifications included a written and practical component. In 1935 the title Medical Technologist (MT) automatically to those certified Laboratory Technicians with college degrees. In 1936, the "Laboratory Technician" designation is retired and subsequent registrants are designated Medical Technologists and the academic requirements were raised to two years of college. In 1938, the Registry was renamed from the Registry of Technicians to the Registry of Medical Technologists. As Canadian pathology society did not have a registry, interested Canadian medical technologists sat for the Amereican ASCP MT certification instead. In 1939, the BOR publishes the first book outlining the educational curriculum for medical technologists entitled Curriculum for Schools of Medical Technology. In 1940, as other organizations began using the same designations, the initials MT(ASCP) were used. In 1944, due to travel wartime restrictions from World War II, the practical component of the certification was discontinued. In 1948, the written essay portion of the certification was deemed too cumbersome to assess, and the certification was switched to a multiple choice and true-false assessment that could be graded on a machine and provide exam statistics. In 1949, the BOR changed the exam format to a 200 multiple choice question exam as the multiple choice questions were found to be a more reliable indicator than true-false questions. In 1949, the BOR also created the Board of Schools (BOS) for registering schools. In 1958, BoR and ASMT assisted with the reclassification of medical technologists, putting them at the professional level in the Civil Service and allowing medical technologists to gain commission status in the US military.

In 1962, the BoR began requiring 3 years of college for the MT certification. In 1972, the BoR began requiring a Bachelor's degree for the MT certification.

There were 100,000 certificates issued by 1975, 200,000 by 1980, 300,000 by 1991, 400,000 by 2005, and 500,000 by 2014.

In July 1991, BOR administered their first Computer adaptive tests the ASCP headquarters for the Medical Technologist (MT), Medical Laboratory Technician (MLT), Phlebotomy Technician (PBT), Cytotechnologist (CT), and Histologic Technician (HT) certification examinations.

In 1994, BOR changed their examination format to Computerized adaptive testing (CAT).

In 2004, the BOR implemented the Certification Maintenance Program (CMP) requiring continuing education every three years to remain certified.

=== Controversy ===
Through its efforts to standardize the training of medical technologists, the Registry has come to be recognized by the leading medical and hospital groups as the only authoritative qualifying body for this field...The Registry, therefore, while purely voluntary and non-coercive, is universally accepted as the authoritative organization for qualifying the medical technologists in the United States.

— Marketing brochure, ASCP Board of Registry (1966)

In the 1960s, the BOR Code of Ethics and Standards of Conduct placed professional limitations on medical technologists requiring "A medical technologist will work at all times under the direction or supervision of a pathologist or other duly qualified and licensed doctor of medicine, such qualifications being determined on the basis of accepted medical ethics" and that "A medical technologist will not act as owner, co-owner, advisor or employee, or by means of any subterfuge, participate in an arrangement whereby an individual not regularly licensed to practice medicine is enabled to own or operate a laboratory of clinical pathology." In 1965, Janet Higgins, an ASCP certified medical technologist, was removed from the Board of Registry (BOR) because she was employed at a New Jersey laboratory where the director was a state-licensed bio-analytical laboratory director, but not a physician. Though New Jersey has never required the certification for employment, the technologist successfully sued ASCP under monopolistic restraint of trade to be reinstated to the registry with the Supreme Court of New Jersey finding that the "professional status conferred on plaintiff by her certificate is an interest of sufficient substance to warrant the protection of the court." The lawsuit, and the focus on pathologists over medical technologists spurred other medical technologist societies, such as the American Society for Medical Technology (ASMT) to promote the creation of their own certifying boards.

The BOR bylaws were updated following the transition from the American Society of Clinical Pathologists to American Society for Clinical Pathology.

== Board of Schools (BOS) ==
In 1949, ASCP stablished the Board of Schools (BOS) for accrediting medical technologist programs and published the Essentials of an Acceptable MT School. In 1973, following antitrust litigation by the United States Department of Education, the ASCP Board of Schools became the independent National Accrediting Agency for Clinical Laboratory Sciences.

== Initiatives ==
In 2022 ASCP received a multi-year grant over $1M to promote the CDC OneLab initiative, a network of laboratory professionals and testers to support rapid, large-scale responses to public health emergencies.

== Certifications ==
ASCP offers a number of certifications. International certifications taken outside the United States are denoted as ASCP^{i}. As of 2022, there were 580,000 ASCP and 20,800 ASCP^{i} certificates awarded. In 2023, the number of MLS ASCPi applicants exceeded the number of MLS ASCP applicants.

Outside the US, the Philippines is largest ASCP^{i} market with a third of eligible Filipino graduates applying for the MLS (ASCP^{i}) certification annually. The credential is not required for practice in the Philippines, but is appealing for its international work eligibility, primarily immigration to the United States.

Name	Abbreviation	Level	First Offered	Discontinued	Notes
Technologist in Blood Banking	BB	Technologist	1983		
Technologist in Chemistry	C	Technologist	1948		
Technologist in Cytogenetics	CG	Technologist	2010		
Cytologist	CT	Technologist	1957		Formerly Cytotechnologist
Histotechnologist	HTL	Technologist	1980		
Technologist in Immunology	I	Technologist	1980		
Technologist in Microbiology	M	Technologist	1948		Formerly Bacteriologist, changed in 1953
Medical Laboratory Scientist	MLS	Technologist	1933		Formerly Medical Technologist (MT)
Technologist in Molecular Biology	MB	Technologist	2003		Formerly Technologist in Molecular Pathology (MP)
Hemapheresis Practitioner	HP	Specialist	1993	2009	Superseded by Qualification in Apheresis (QIA)
Specialist in Blood Banking	SBB	Specialist	1954		
Specialist in Chemistry	SC	Specialist	1954		
Specialist in Cytology	SCT	Specialist	1959		Formerly Specialist in Cytotechnology
Specialist in Cytometry	SCYM	Specialist	2017		
Specialist in Hematology	SH	Specialist	1968		
Specialist in Laboratory Safety	SLS	Specialist	2000	2011	Superseded by Qualification in Laboratory Safety (QLS)
Specialist in Immunology	SI	Specialist	1982		
Specialist in Microbiology	SM	Specialist	1953		
Specialist in Virology	SV	Specialist	1988		
Specialist in Molecular Biology	SMB	Specialist	2018		
Diplomate in Laboratory Management	DLM	Other	1989		
Diplomate in Medical Laboratory Immunology	DLMI	Other	2023		
Pathologists' Assistant	PA	Other	2005		
Apheresis Technician	AT	Technician	2003	2009	Superseded by Qualification in Apheresis (QIA)
Donor Phlebotomy Technician	DPT	Technician	2003		
Histotechnician	HT	Technician	1948		Formerly Histologic Technician
Laboratory Aide	LA	Technician	1948	1964	Replaced by Clinical Laboratory Assistant (CLA)
Clinical Laboratory Assistant	CLA	Technician	1963	1982	
Medical Laboratory Assistant	MLA	Technician	2015		
Medical Laboratory Technician	MLT	Technician			
Phlebotomy Technician	PBT	Technician	1990		
Gynecologic Cytologist	CTgyn	Technologist			
Qualification in Biorepository Science	QBRS	Qualification	2020		
Qualification in Donor Phlebotomy	QDP	Qualification			
Qualification in Apheresis	QIA	Qualification			
Qualification in Cytometry	QCYM	Qualification	1993	2017	
Qualification in Immunohistochemistry	QIHC	Qualification	1994		
Qualification in Lab Informatics	QLI	Qualification	2003	2017	
Qualification in Laboratory Safety	QLS	Qualification			
Qualification in Laboratory Compliance	QLC	Qualification	2003	Yes	
Qualification in Point of Care Testing Evaluator	QPOCTE	Qualification	1997	Yes	

=== Accreditation agencies ===
The following lists the eligible programs under accreditation agencies

- National Accrediting Agency for Clinical Laboratory Sciences (NAACLS)
  - Medical Laboratory Technician/Medical Laboratory Scientist
  - Histotechnician/Histotechnologist
  - Cytogenetics
  - Diagnostic Molecular Science (can sit for the Technologist in Molecular Biology exam)
  - Pathologists' Assistant
  - Phlebotomy
  - Clinical Assistant (can sit for the Medical Laboratory Assistant exam)
- Commission on Accreditation of Allied Health Education Programs (CAAHEP)
  - Cytotechnologist
  - Specialist in Blood Banking
- Accrediting Bureau of Health Education Schools (ABHES)
  - Medical Laboratory Technician
