= Institute for Credentialing Excellence =

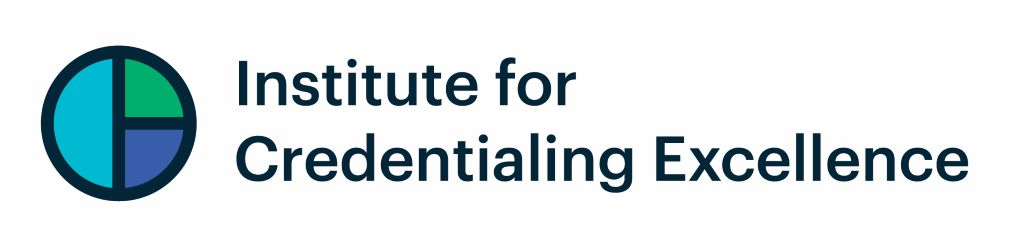
- Abbreviation: I.C.E.
- Founded: 1977; 49 years ago
- Type: 501(c)(3)
- Tax ID no.: 52-1111515
- Legal status: Nonprofit organization
- Purpose: Lead through accreditation, advocacy, education, innovation, research, and standards to enhance the value of credentialing organizations..
- Location: Washington, D.C., U.S.
- Coordinates: 38.905937°N 77.045989°W
- Executive Director: Denise Roosendaal
- Chair, Board of Directors: Tony Ellis
- Revenue: $3.5M (2026)
- Expenses: $3.5M (2026)
- Website: www.credentialingexcellence.org
- Formerly called: National Organization for Competency Assurance (NOCA), National Commission for Health Certifying Agencies (NCHCA)

The Institute for Credentialing Excellence (I.C.E.) is one of the two main U.S. organizations that accredit personnel certifications or certificates. (Note: The other main organization being the American National Standards Institute) In November 2009 the ICE formally changed its name from the National Organization for Competency Assurance (NOCA).

I.C.E. is an accredited standards developer by the American National Standards Institute.

== History ==
In cooperation with the federal government, the National Commission for Health Certifying Agencies (NCHCA) was founded in 1977 in order to develop standards for voluntary certification programs. In 1989, the NCHCA was expanded to developing certifications for all professions, becoming the National Commission for Certifying Agencies (NCCA), and forming the National Organization for Competency Assurance (NOCA) as a membership association for credentialing bodies. In 2009, the Board moved to change to a new name and became the Institute for Credentialing Excellence (ICE).

== National Commission for Certifying Agencies ==
The National Commission for Certifying Agencies (NCCA) is the accreditation body of the Institute for Credentialing Excellence. The NCCA's Standards for the Accreditation of Certification Programs exceed the requirements set forth by the American Psychological Association and the US Equal Employment Opportunity Commission. In the state of California all organizations that wish to be recognized as counselor certifying organizations must be accredited by the NCCA.

== Management structure ==
The Institute for Credentialing Excellence has no employees. Instead, it pays Smitbucklin Corporation, a for-profit corporation, to employ individuals who run the Institute for Credentialing Excellence. Smithbucklin Corporation received $2 million out of the $3.5 million of revenue received by the Institute for Credentialing Excellence in 2018.
