= American Medical Technologists =

The American Medical Technologists (AMT) is a professional association that encompasses 80,000 allied health professionals. It was founded in 1939.

The organization published a bi-monthly journal entitled The Journal of American Medical Technologists. It advocated for professional status and to secure state licensure for medical technologists. Membership required completion of a year-long educational program, or two years of on-the-job training.

== Certifications ==
The following certifications are offered.

Name	Abbr.	Notes
Medical Laboratory Scientist	MLS	Formerly Medical Technologist (MT).
Medical Laboratory Technician	MLT	
Molecular Diagnostics Technologist	MDT	
Medical Laboratory Assistant	CMLA	
Certified Laboratory Consultant	CLC	
Medical Assistant	RMA	
Phlebotomy Technician	RPT	
Patient Care Technician	PCT	
Medical Administrative Specialist	CMAS	
Dental Assistant	RDA	
Allied Health Instructor	AHI	

The Medical Laboratory Scientist certification is recognized by US states with laboratory personnel licensure, with the exception of New York, which only accepts MLS(AMT) for provisional licensure.
