= Medical laboratory scientist =

Medical professional who works in the laboratory

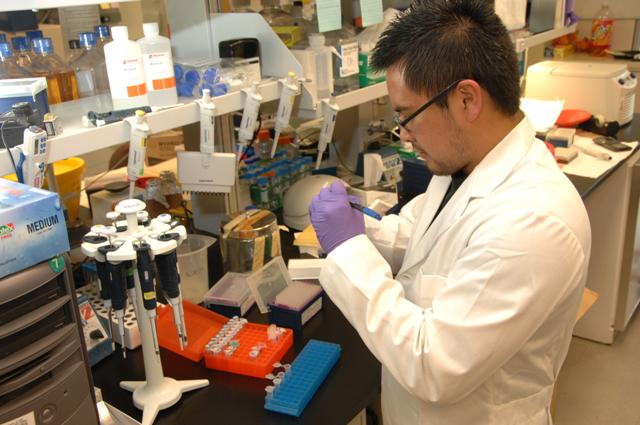
- A medical laboratory scientist at the National Institutes of Health preparing DNA samples

Occupation
- Names: Medical laboratory scientist (MLS) / clinical laboratory scientist (CLS) / medical technologist (MT); Doctor of Medical Laboratory Science (DMLS) / Doctor of Clinical Laboratory Science (DCLS)
- Occupation type: Professional
- Activity sectors: Health care, medicine, research & development, allied health, biomedical research

Description
- Competencies: Analytical skills, quality control and knowledge of laboratory medicine and technology, ethics, art and science of medicine, analytical skills, and critical thinking
- Education required: Doctor of Philosophy, for management/directorship roles; Doctor of Medical Laboratory Sciences (DMLS), for management/directorship roles; Master of Science, often for education/management roles; Honours degree in Laboratory Science (scientist); Bachelor of Science in Medical Laboratory Science (scientist); Bachelor of Biomedical Science; Bachelor of Medical Laboratory Technology; Doctor of Medical Laboratory Science (doctor or DMLS)
- Fields of employment: Hospital; Clinic; Private laboratory; Government agency; Non-governmental organization; Biomedical engineer; Biomedical technology industry
- Related jobs: Pathologist; Cyto- and histotechnologist; Haematologist; Phlebotomist

A medical laboratory scientist (MLS), clinical laboratory scientist (CLS), or medical technologist (MT) is a licensed healthcare professional who performs diagnostic testing of body fluids, examples: blood, urine, sputum and other body tissue. The medical technologist is tasked with releasing the patient's results to aid in further treatment. The scope of a medical laboratory scientist's work begins with the receipt of patient or client specimens, and finishes with the delivery of test results to physicians and other healthcare providers.

The utility of clinical diagnostic testing relies squarely on the validity of test methodology. To this end, much of the work done by medical laboratory scientists involves ensuring specimen quality, interpreting test results, data-logging, testing control products, performing calibration, maintenance, validation, and troubleshooting of instrumentation as well as performing statistical analyses to verify the accuracy and repeatability of testing. Medical laboratory scientists may also assist healthcare providers with test selection and specimen collection and are responsible for prompt verbal delivery of critical lab results. Medical laboratory scientists in healthcare settings also play an important role in clinical diagnosis; some estimates suggest that up to 70% of medical decisions are based on laboratory test results and MLS contributions affect 95% of a health system's costs.

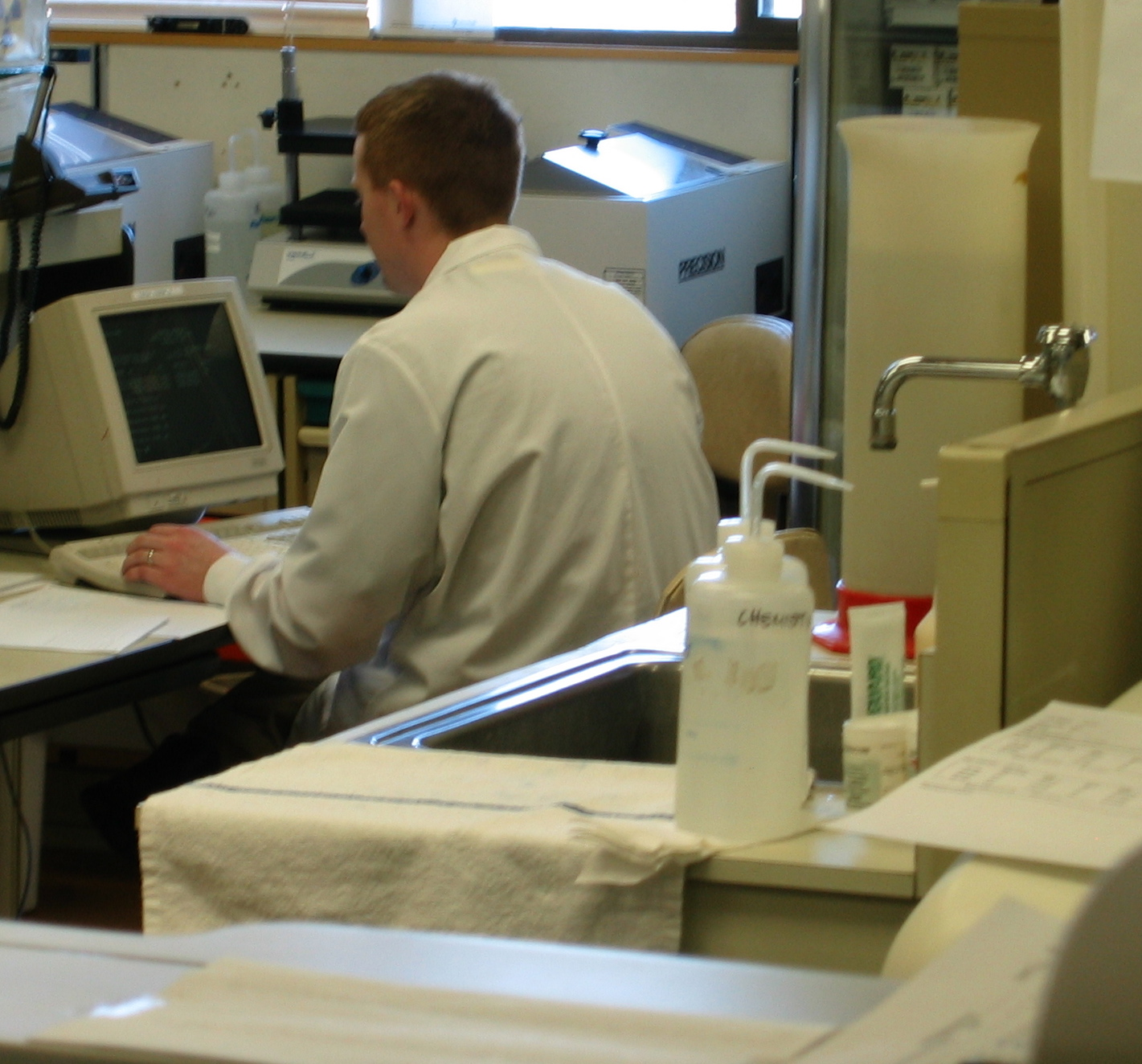
MLS in his work environment

The most common tests performed by medical laboratory scientists are complete blood count (CBC), comprehensive metabolic panel (CMP), electrolyte panel, liver function tests (LFT), renal function tests (RFT), thyroid function test (TFT), urinalysis, coagulation profile, lipid profile, blood type, genotype, pack cells volume (PCV), hepatitis (HbsAg and HCV), glucose test (fasting blood sugar {FBS} and random blood sugar {RBS}), Endo cervical swab (ECS), high vaginal swab (HVS), semen fluid analysis (for fertility and post-vasectomy studies), serological studies and routine cultures. In some facilities that have few phlebotomists, or none at all, (such as in rural areas) medical laboratory scientists may perform phlebotomy. Because medical laboratory scientists have many transferable technical skills, employment outside of the medical laboratory is common. Many medical laboratory scientists are employed in government positions such as the FDA, USDA, non-medical industrial laboratories, and manufacturing.

In the United Kingdom and the United States, senior laboratory scientists, who are typically post-doctoral scientists, take on significantly greater clinical responsibilities in the laboratory. In the United States these scientists may function in the role of clinical laboratory directors, while in the United Kingdom they are known as consultant clinical scientists.

Though clinical scientists have existed in the UK National Health Service for ≈60 years, the introduction of formally-trained and accredited consultant-level clinical scientists is relatively new, and was introduced as part of the new Modernizing Scientific Careers framework developed in 2008.

Consultant clinical scientists are expected to provide expert scientific and clinical leadership alongside and, at the same level as, medical consultant colleagues. While specialists in healthcare science will follow protocols, procedures and clinical guidelines, consultant clinical scientists will help shape future guidelines and the implementation of new and emerging technologies to help advance patient care.

In the United Kingdom, healthcare scientists including clinical scientists may intervene throughout entire care pathways from diagnostic tests to therapeutic treatments and rehabilitation. Although this workforce comprises approximately 5% of the healthcare workforce in the UK, their work underpins 80% of all diagnoses and clinical decisions.

== Specialty areas ==
Many medical laboratory scientists are generalists, skilled in most areas of the clinical laboratory. However, some are specialists, qualified by unique undergraduate education or additional training to perform more complex analyses than usual within a specific field. Specialties include clinical biochemistry, hematology, coagulation, microbiology, bacteriology, toxicology, virology, parasitology, mycology, immunology, immunohematology (blood bank), histopathology, histocompatibility, cytopathology, genetics, cytogenetics, electron microscopy, and IVF labs. Medical technologists specialty may use additional credentials, such as "SBB" (specialist in blood banking), "SM" (specialist in microbiology), "SC" (specialist in chemistry), or "SH" (specialist in hematology) from the American Society for Clinical Pathology (ASCP). These additional notations may be appended to the base credential, for example, "MLS (ASCP), SBB (ASCP)". Additional information can be found in the ASCP Procedures for Examination & Certification.

Andrology laboratory scientist (such as those working for a sperm bank), embryology laboratory scientist, and molecular diagnostics technologist certifications are provided by the American Association of Bioanalysts; those with the certifications are classified as ALS (AAB), ELS (AAB), and MDxT (AAB), respectively. Certified histocompatibility associate, certified histocompatibility technologist, certified histocompatibility specialist, and diplomate of the ABHI are titles granted by the American Board of Hisocompatibility and Immunogenetics after meeting education and experience requirements and passing the required examination; those individuals would hold the credentials CHA (ABHI), CHT (ABHI), CHS (AHBI), and D (ABHI) upon passing the corresponding examination.

In the United States, medical laboratory scientists can be certified and employed in infection control. These professionals monitor and report infectious disease findings to help limit iatrogenic and nosocomial infections. They may also educate other healthcare workers about such problems and ways to minimize them.

In the United Kingdom, the number of clinical scientists in a pathology discipline is typically greater, where less medically qualified pathologists train as consultants. Clinical biochemistry, clinical immunology and genomic medicine are specialities with an abundance of UK clinical scientists, and where the role is well established. Infection services in the UK are generally undertaken by medically qualified Microbiologists, who may have overall responsibility for laboratory services in addition to Infection Prevention and Control responsibilities, and may be required to contribute to ward rounds and patient clinics. Therefore, the Royal College of Pathologists and Royal College of Physicians have developed combined infection training, that medical trainees gain a much more patient focused experience, and undertake physician examinations in addition to pathology training. The result of this is that several regional medical deaneries no longer permit medical doctors to train in microbiology or virology as single disciplines, and instead advocate dual-specialisation as infectious disease/microbiology or infectious disease/virology. Simultaneously, the expansion of higher specialist scientist trainees in microbiology means that many of the laboratory and scientific responsibilities of medical doctors may be taken on by clinical scientists, and medical doctors will instead be expected to perform a much more patient facing role. The exception in microbiology is the sub-discipline of virology, which is well suited to the expertise of clinical scientists due to reliance on cutting-edge scientific methods, increasing use of specialised genetic technologies, and a technical understanding of virus biology, with a reduced emphasis on patient management compared with microbiology as a whole.

== Educational requirements ==
Educational and licensing requirements vary by country due to differing scopes of practice and legislative differences.

=== Australia ===
In Australia, medical laboratory scientists complete a four-year undergraduate degree program in medical science, medical laboratory science or laboratory medicine. These programs should be accredited by the Australian Institute of Medical and Clinical Scientists (AIMS).

=== Canada ===
In Canada, three-year college or technical school programs are offered that include seven semesters, two of them comprising an unpaid internship. The student graduates before taking a standard examination (such as the Canadian Society for Medical Laboratory Science, or CSMLS, exam) to be qualified as a medical laboratory technologist. Many MLTs go on to Canada, which is currently experiencing an increasing problem with staffing shortages in medical laboratories.

=== New Zealand ===
In New Zealand, a medical laboratory scientist must complete a bachelor's degree in medical laboratory science or biological or chemical science recognized by the Medical Sciences Council of New Zealand. As part of this degree they must complete clinical placement. Once they graduate they must have worked at least six months under supervision, be registered with the Medical Sciences Counsel of New Zealand, and hold a current Annual Practicing Certificate.

=== Ghana ===
In Ghana, a doctor of medical laboratory scientist (MLS.D) is a professional with a six years professional doctorate degree in medical laboratory science, the medical laboratory scientist (MLS) has four years bachelor's degree in medical laboratory science and the medical laboratory technicians (MLT) has three years diploma in medical laboratory science.

The curriculum for the programme include internship rotations, where the students get hands-on experiences in each discipline of the laboratory and performs diagnostic testing in a functioning laboratory under supervision.

=== India ===
In India, medical laboratory science education is divided into secondary, post-secondary, undergraduate, and post-graduate. The courses are offered by many state boards of vocational education post-secondary, State technical education boards, and various universities under the UGC. Some universities have vocational degrees abbreviated as Bachelor in vocational education (B.Voc MLT) and Masters in vocational education (M.Voc MLT). Medical laboratory technologist and technician registration is done at the state level. A new commission will be formed called the National Commission for Allied and Healthcare Professions (NCAHP) to replace state registers with central registers enforced and controlled by NCAHP.

- After secondary (10+), education is called DMLT; it is two years offered by vocational boards of respective states.
- After post-secondary education (12+), it is also called the DMLT of two years offered by vocational boards of respective states.
- The undergraduate degree in MLT is three or four years offered by universities.
- State boards of technical education (i.e., MSBTE) offer an Advanced Diploma of two years equivalent to the PGDMLT (postgraduate diploma in medical laboratory technology) offered by universities.
- A postgraduate degree in MLS is two years offered by universities.

=== Pakistan ===
In Pakistan, the National Institute of Health (NIH) in Islamabad is the pioneer in laboratory sciences. The College of Medical Lab Technology (CMLT) of the NIH offers a two-year F.Sc degree in Medical Lab Technology (MLT). The previous two-year B.Sc. in MLT was discontinued and replaced by the four-year Bachelor Program in Medical Lab Sciences (MLS). The University of Health Sciences in Lahore also offers a four-year Bachelor program in MLS through approved colleges. The University of Lahore, University of Faisalabad, University of Sargodha, and Superior University in Lahore all offer a five-year Doctor of Medical Lab Sciences (DMLS) Program. Eligibility criteria for the four-year B.Sc. in MLS and the five-year Doctor of Medical Lab Sciences (DMLS) is the F.Sc. Pre-Medical.

=== United States ===
Brochure illustrating the work of the CDC Division of Laboratory Sciences

In the United States, a medical laboratory scientist (MLS), medical technologist (MT), or a clinical laboratory scientist (CLS) typically earns a bachelor's degree in medical laboratory science, clinical laboratory science, or medical technology. Other routes include attaining a degree in biomedical science or in a life / biological science (biology, biochemistry, microbiology, etc.). Both routes typically requires the MLS/MT/CLS to obtain certification from a national certifying board (AAB, AMT, or ASCP) as most laboratories exceed the federal minimum requirements established by the Clinical Laboratory Improvement Amendments (CLIA).

Common comprehensive medical laboratory scientist degree programs are set up in a few different ways.

- In 3+1 programs, the student attends classroom courses for three years and complete a clinical rotation their final year of study.
- In 2+2 programs, students have already completed their lower division coursework and return to complete their last two years of study in a CLS program.
- In 4+1 program, students who have already completed an undergraduate program return to complete a year of medical laboratory training. The training is typically completed at a clinical site rather than a college.

The core curriculum in medical technology generally comprises 20 credits in clinical chemistry, 20 credits in hematology, and 20 credits in clinical microbiology.

During clinical rotations, the student experiences hands-on learning in each discipline of the laboratory and performs diagnostic testing in a functioning laboratory under supervision. With limited or no compensation, a student in the clinical phase of training usually works 40 hours per week for 20 to 52 weeks. Some programs in the United States have halved the time students spend completing their clinical rotation reduced due to staffing shortages. For example, in 2015, the MLS program at the University of Minnesota reduced the clinical rotation portion of the program from 22 weeks to 12 weeks.

In the United States, a two-year academic program (associate's degree) qualifies the graduate to work as a medical laboratory technician (MLT). MLTs receive training more exclusively in laboratory sciences without the basic science coursework often required by MLS programs; however, there are many MLT training programs that require substantial basic didactic science course work prior to entry into a clinical practicum. Although the didactic coursework may be less for the MLT, the clinical practicum, in many cases, is similar to that of the MLS student's. This equates to MLTs who are well equipped to enter the work force with relevant and knowledge based practical application. The shorter training time may be attractive to many students, but there are disadvantages to this route. MTs, MLSs and CLSs usually earn higher salaries and have more responsibilities than MLTs. In 2018, medical laboratory technicians earned an average salary of $51,219, while medical laboratory scientists earned a salary of $67,888. An added disadvantage for MLTs is that some institutions will only employ MLSs, although that practice is starting to change due to recent efforts in cost reduction, and due to staffing shortages.

In practice, the term medical laboratory technician may apply to persons who are trained to operate equipment and perform tests, usually under the supervision of the certified medical technologist or laboratory scientist. Depending on the state where employment is granted, the job duties between MLSs and MLTs may or may not be similar. For example, in Florida, a MLT may only perform highly complex testing while under the direct supervision of a clinical laboratory technologist, a clinical laboratory supervisor, or a clinical laboratory director. This may make it impractical for a MLT to lawfully work in a Florida blood bank. California has similar restrictions on MLTs. To accommodate California's restrictions, the American Association of Bioanalysts (AAB) developed a separate certification examination for California licensure. However, this exam does not include material covering the areas of immunohematology or microscopy. Although the typical entry-level academic requirement for most MLTs is an associate degree, a 60 credit certificate program exists through military training programs; such as the U.S. Army's 68K military occupational specialty.

As in other countries, staffing shortages have become a major issue in many clinical laboratories in the United States. Due to several factors, including boomer retirement, and inadequate recruitment and retention efforts, the medical laboratory workforce is shrinking. For the decade 2010–2020, workforce needs are expected to grow by 13%. This translates into about 11,300 positions per year that will need to be filled, with only about 5000 new graduates per year coming out of various programs. It was estimated that the shortage of medical laboratory professionals would reach 98,700 in the U.S. by 2025.

=== United Kingdom ===
In the United Kingdom (UK) there are two varieties of registered healthcare scientist in hospitals - Clinical Scientists and Biomedical Scientists (BMS). There is a strict and formal post graduate training programme for both careers followed by statutory registration for each with the Health & Care Professions Council UK (HCPC), for the safety and assurance of the customers - the patients. They are two similar but distinct careers with parallel but different training paths and different entry requirements.

The role of Clinical Scientists is to improve the health and well-being of patients and the public by practising alongside doctors, nurses, and other health and social care professionals in the delivery of healthcare. Their aim is to provide expert scientific and clinical advice to clinician colleagues, to aid in the diagnosis, treatment and management of patient care.

Examples of the type of work they undertake include:

- Advising, diagnosing, interpreting, and treating patients
- Advising health and social care professionals in the diagnosis and treatment of patients
- Researching the science, technology, and practise used in healthcare to innovate and improve services
- Designing, building, and operating technology for diagnosing and treating patients
- Ensuring the safety and reliability of tests and equipment used in healthcare

Trainee clinical scientist posts are advertised nationally, usually between November and February on the Clinical scientists recruitment webpages where application forms may be obtained and electronic submission of applications can be made. These posts are for the approved pre-registration training programme, designed to prepare entrants for higher professional qualifications, further clinical training and eventual Consultant responsibility.

Clinical scientist training involves enrolment of graduates (first or second class honours degree or better is essential due to the high competition for limited training places) into an intensive three-year training scheme leading to certification and eventual registration before starting the higher career structure. The basic qualification for becoming a clinical biochemist, clinical immunologist or clinical microbiologist is a good honours degree in an appropriate subject: for clinical biochemistry, that subject might be biochemistry or chemistry (or another life science subject which contains a substantial biochemistry component); for clinical immunology, that subject might be any life science degree with an immunology component; for clinical microbiology, that subject might be any life science degree with a microbiology component.

Although not essential, some candidates will apply with higher degrees in an attempt to improve their chances of selection for training and several universities currently offer MSc courses in clinical biochemistry, Immunology and Microbiology which have been approved by the ACB or the AHCS. Full-time and 'sandwich' courses are available, and further information may be obtained from individual programmes, although the level of financial support provided varies, and should be clarified at interview. Some entrants to the profession will already have obtained a PhD, and the training and research experience that this provides is invaluable to the work of the clinical scientist. In larger departments, there may be opportunities to study for a research degree after entering the profession and acquiring registration, but since this has to be fitted in with other responsibilities, it may take some years to complete. It should be clearly understood that the major role of the profession is patient care and that research, management and all the other aspects will come as side issues and not be the predominating factor in the career path. The work of biomedical scientists and clinical scientists have impact on the diagnosis and treatment of almost every patient admitted to hospitals in the United Kingdom.

The United Kingdom is facing a shortage of qualified clinical and biomedical scientists. The Royal College of Pathologists and the Royal College of Physicians have pointed out the need for increased government funding for medical training programs to prevent diagnostic facilities and medical infrastructure from being overwhelmed. MSF claims that these workers have lost out financially since the decision of the then health minister Kenneth Clarke to exclude them from the pay review body in 1984.

=== Nigeria ===
In Nigeria, medical laboratory science is a high skilled profession charged by Act 11 of 2003 Laws of the Federation of Nigeria. The initial qualification awarded graduates of the programme, like some other medical programmes, was Associate of the Institute of Medical Laboratory Technology/Science (AIMLT/AIMLS).

The Medical Laboratory Science Council of Nigeria, which was established by Act. 2004 Cap 114 Laws of the Federation of Nigeria, regulates the practice of medical laboratory science in Nigeria. In Nigeria, the Medical Laboratory Science programme is Bachelor of Medical Laboratory Science (BMLS), regulated by the National Universities Commission (NUC) and the Medical Laboratory Science Council of Nigeria (MLSCN). Students at their first year (100 level) are trained under the Faculty of Science in Basic Sciences and Faculty of Arts, Management and Social science in General studies and Entrepreneurship. At the 200 level, students are taught basic medical sciences and are introduced to Medical Laboratory Science. The third year of the programme marks the beginning of the professional training as students are engaged in the classroom for lectures as well as in the Hospital laboratory for the professional or practical training. At the fourth year, students are taught the basics in all the special areas of medical laboratory science. At the end of 400 level programme, successful students are presented for the first professional examination, to be moderated by the Medical Laboratory Science Council of Nigeria. At the fifth year, students break into four core or specialized areas of medical laboratory science, namely: medical microbiology/parasitology, chemical pathology/immunology, haematology/blood transfusion science and histopathology/cytopathology. At the end of the fifth year, suitable students are presented for final professional examination by the Medical Laboratory Science Council of Nigeria.

== Certification and licensing ==
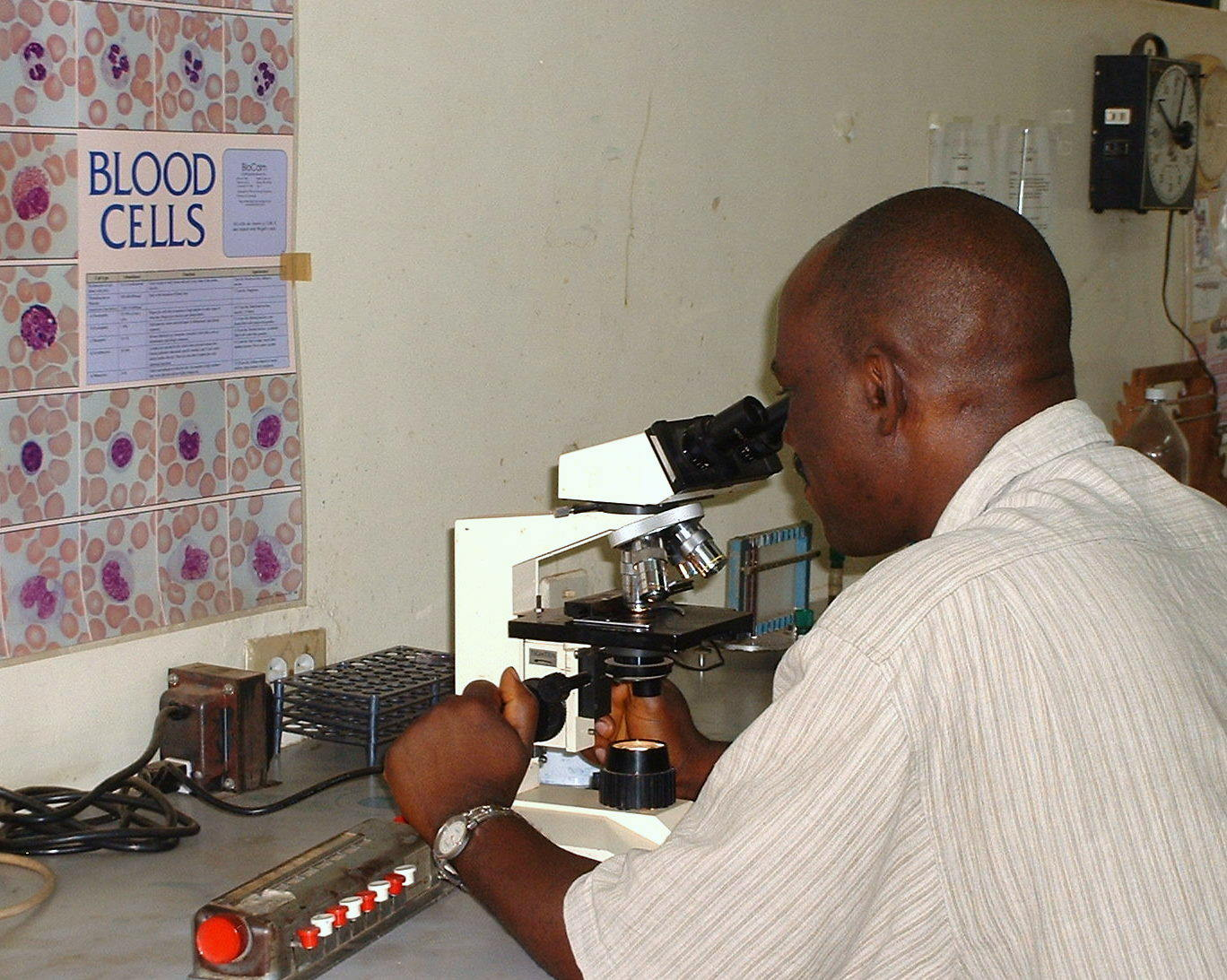
A lab tech uses a microscope for a cell count.

=== United States ===
There are currently three major certification agencies in the United States of America for clinical laboratory scientists. They are the American Association of Bioanalysts (AAB), the American Medical Technologists (AMT), and the American Society for Clinical Pathology (ASCP). Clinical Laboratory Science programs have the option to be accredited by the National Accrediting Agency for Clinical Laboratory Science (NAACLS). NAACLS accreditation allows students to sit for their certification at the completion of their program in addition to being a stamp of program quality. All the three national accrediting agencies will certify scientists in the clinical laboratory as generalist (chemistry, hematology, immunology, immunohematology/blood bank, and microbiology). The American Association of Bioanalysts and the American Medical Technologists certifications continue to use the traditional designation medical technologist (MT), while the American Society for Clinical Pathology has adopted the designation of medical laboratory scientist (MLS). Regardless of terminology, these highly qualified individuals serve as scientists in the clinical laboratory.

Two other organizations have previously provided proficiency examinations to clinical laboratory scientists: the US Department of Health and Human Services, and the National Credentialing Agency for Laboratory Personnel (NCA). The NCA was absorbed by the American Society for Clinical Pathology in 2009 and promptly dissolved.

In the United States, the Clinical Laboratory Improvement Amendments (CLIA '88) define the level of qualification required to perform tests of various complexity. Clinical laboratory scientists, medical technologists and medical laboratory scientists are near the highest level of qualification among general testing personnel and are usually qualified to perform the most complex clinical testing including HLA testing (also known as tissue typing) and blood type reference testing. Provider Performed Microscopy, or PPM (doctorate or master's level health provider) and Cytology have additional requirements.

In addition to the national certification, 11 states (California, Florida, Georgia, Hawaii, Louisiana, Montana, Nevada, North Dakota, Rhode Island, West Virginia and New York) and Puerto Rico also require a state license. Puerto Rico, in order to provide the state license, requires either a local board certification with a state examination, or any of both the ASCP and the NCA. Minnesota, Texas, Illinois, Massachusetts, Michigan, Vermont, Washington, New Jersey, Iowa, Utah, Ohio, South Carolina, Wyoming, Pennsylvania, Virginia, South Dakota, Delaware, Missouri, and Alaska are currently attempting to obtain licensure. All states require documentation from a professional certification agency before issuing a state certification. A person applying for state certification may also be expected to submit fingerprints, education and training records, and competency certification. Some states also require completion of a specified number of continuing education contact hours prior to issuing or renewing a license. Licensing is somewhat controversial as it adds a bureaucratic layer in a field that is severely understaffed.

Some states recognize another state's license if it is equal or more stringent, but currently California does not recognize any other state license.

=== United Kingdom ===
In the United Kingdom all clinical scientists and biomedical scientists have had to be registered with the Health & Care Professions Council (HCPC) in order to work unsupervised, to develop through the careers grades of their profession and to use the protected titles of "clinical scientist" or "biomedical scientist". The HCPC registers nearly 200,000 healthcare professionals and while success in an approved degree course from an accredited university is sufficient for all other professions, both clinical scientists and biomedical scientists have post graduate training and no approved degree courses. Autonomous assessment of applicants in these two professions with subsequent certification for successful ones, is the only approved UK route to registration for them.

"Clinical scientist", just as "biomedical scientist", is a protected title under the law (there is a £5000 fine for transgressors who fraudulently use the title without being registered by the state). The HCPC can strike people off the register for malpractice in just the same way as for doctors with the General Medical Council (GMC).

Those who are working in trainee positions in the profession are permitted to use the title with an appropriate caveat, for example "pre-registration clinical scientist", "trainee clinical scientist", etc. Alternatively some may use titles specific to the discipline they train in, such as "trainee clinical biochemist", "clinical immunologist in training" or "pre-registrant clinical microbiologist", which is also acceptable since it is not implying the protected "clinical scientist" title of fully qualified and registered practitioners. It is against the law to formally work with the title of "clinical scientist" without professional registration.

=== Nigeria ===
In Nigeria, successful student at the end of the training in both academic and professional assessments with respect to the graduation requirements is certified by the respective University, inducted and licensed by the Medical Laboratory Science Council of Nigeria after a successful one-year internship training.

== Further education ==
As in many healthcare professions, a medical laboratory scientist may pursue higher education to advance or further specialize in their career.

- Master of Science, Master of Business Administration, Master of Health Administration, Doctor of medical laboratory science for specialization, education and management roles.
- Doctor of Philosophy for management and directorship roles in the clinical laboratory as well as for academic research and professorship. Doctors of Philosophy holding a degree in a biological science, and who are board certified by a CLIA-approved entity, are qualified as a medical laboratory director.
- Doctor of Medicine or Doctor of clinical laboratory Science - this is the position that qualifies an individual to oversee or direct almost all types of clinical laboratories. Under U.S. CLIA laws, a requirement of at least year of clinical laboratory experience (any MD) or pathology residency must be met.

In the United Kingdom the Modernising Scientific Careers (MSC) programme sets out a training and career framework for the healthcare science workforce. One aspect of the framework was the formalisation of training to develop talented clinical scientists to undertake Higher Specialist Scientist Training (HSST) programmes to prepare them for roles as consultant clinical scientists.

Training through the Higher Specialist Scientist Training pathway is discipline specific. For life science disciplines (immunology, microbiology, virology, haematology, biochemistry) the training curriculum and formal examinations are administered by the Royal College of Pathologists. The life science training pathway for clinical scientists follows a similar pathway to that undertaken by medically qualified specialist registrars in pathology. Clinical scientists are therefore the only discipline of non-medical healthcare professionals examined by a Medical Royal College. Clinical scientists who attain both part 1 examination certification and part 2 certification are awarded Fellowship of the Royal College of Pathologists (FRCPath) and are deemed to have the knowledge and expertise expected of a consultant level scientist. Consultant clinical scientist posts generally require candidates to have completed FRCPath qualification to be eligible.

All clinical scientists regardless of seniority or specialisation may have other responsibilities including academic appointments, responsibilities as clinical lead for a pathology service, or may have wider hospital responsibilities such as directorship of Infection Prevention and Control, or responsibility for the hospital's Research and Development strategy. Junior clinical scientists may become involved in academic research, working towards a Ph.D. or DClinSci.

== Job title ==
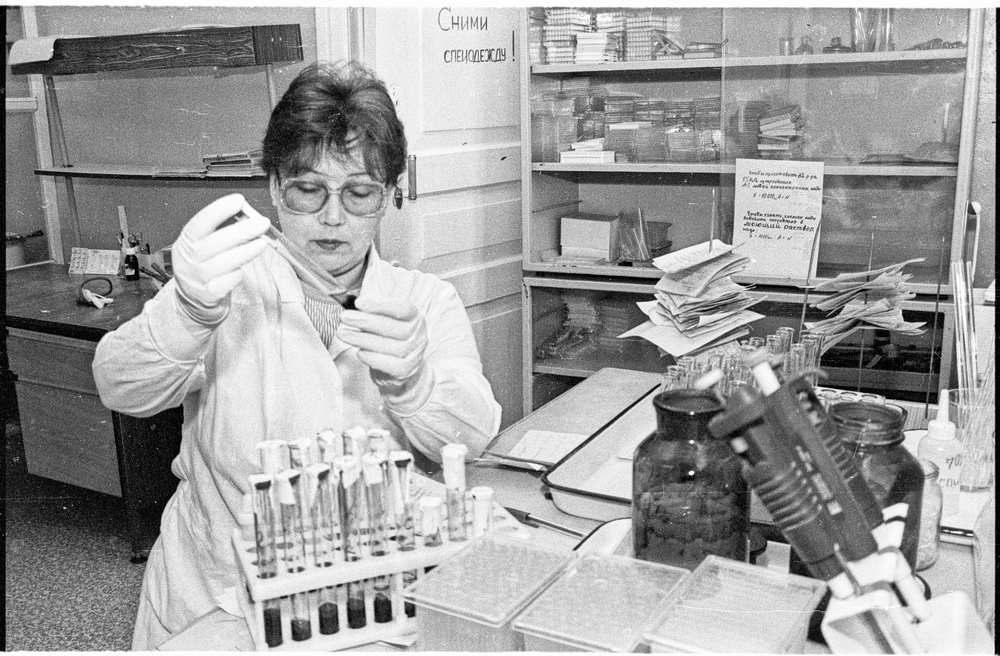
Russian MLS prepares the analyses in ELISA laboratory.

The informal abbreviations of job titles may be a source of confusion. In the United States, medical laboratory scientist (ASCP) and medical technologists (AMT) or (AAB) are often called "med techs" (based on the era in which they were known as "medical technologists"), but this shorthand term is shared by other healthcare employees, including pharmacy techs, radiographers (also known as radiologic technologists), and respiratory therapists.

In the United States there is a formal distinction between an MLT and a MT/MLS. Often, MT/MLS have at least a bachelor's degree, while MLT have an associate degree. However, due to grandfathering rules and certification requirements between the boards of registry, some MT/MLS may only have an associate degree. Scientists and technologists generally earn a higher income than technicians, have more responsibilities, and have more opportunities for advancement.

In the United Kingdom, there are defined training pathways leading to professional registration as either a clinical scientist, or as a biomedical scientist. The role descriptions for these healthcare scientists are very different, where clinical scientists generally undertake non-routine research and development, as well as improving and providing clinical service using scientific expertise. Biomedical scientists in the United Kingdom are similar to the role of MLT and MT/CLS described above, and have similar regulatory requirements for professional regulation. Clinical scientists in the United Kingdom may struggle with a lack of professional recognition. This is in part due to the myriad job titles used to describe them, including clinical physiologists, medical physicists, and clinical biochemists, which generally mean the public and other healthcare workers assume clinical scientists to be medically qualified doctors, due to the sometimes complex nature of the role.

== Labor shortage ==
Medical facilities throughout the United States have gradually been experiencing a shortage in medical laboratory science professionals. The current projectory of medical laboratory personnel through 2030 is insufficient to serve medical services effectively. Reasons for the shortage include current professionals retiring, a modern increase in medical laboratory scientist and technician demand, changes in the practice caused by new technological advances (which need training to learn to use), and vacancy and retirement rates being greater than the number of graduates from medical laboratory programs. Lack of funding, low salaries, lack of a developed career ladder, and a lack of clear job requirements has made recruitment and the hiring process difficult.

Newer recruiting attempts have increased the number of graduated professionals in the last five years, but not enough to meet the growing demand. Some clinical organizations suggest that professional-development programs for the allied health fields should be improved to cultivate interest in younger professionals and students. The Institute of Medicine is actively working on re-viewing policy reforms and new plans and recommendations to increase medical professional turnout among younger people. The COVID-19 pandemic highlighted the medical laboratory shortage in the medical field. Organizations such as the American Society for Clinical Laboratory Science and the American Society for Clinical Pathology are pushing for new ways to reduce this shortage and meet the demands of the public.

== See also ==
- Laboratory information system
- Medical technology
- Medical laboratory
- Phlebotomist
- Reference ranges for common blood tests
- Urine test

- Allied health professions
- Automated analyser
- Blood bank
- Blood test
- Biomedical Scientist similar career outside of the US
- Body fluids
- Clinical pathology
- ISO 15189
