= NeoGenomics =

Cancer-focused genetic testing and lab services company

NeoGenomics Laboratories, Inc.
- Company type: Public
- Traded as: Nasdaq: NEO; S&P 600 Component; Russell 2000 Component
- Industry: Biotechnology, Health care
- Founded: 2002; 24 years ago
- Headquarters: Fort Myers, Florida, United States
- Number of locations: 13
- Area served: Worldwide
- Key people: Tony Zook (CEO); Lynn A. Tetrault (Chair of the Board)
- Services: Cancer genetics diagnostic testing
- Revenue: $500M
- Number of employees: 2200 (2025)
- Website: neogenomics.com

NeoGenomics Laboratories, Inc., also known as NeoGenomics or Neo, is an American CLIA-certified clinical laboratory, pharma services and information services company that specializes in cancer genetics diagnostic testing. The company's testing services include cytogenetics, fluorescence in situ hybridization (FISH), flow cytometry, immunohistochemistry, anatomic pathology, and molecular genetics.

Headquartered in Fort Myers, FL, NeoGenomics maintains a network of testing facilities across the US, with laboratories in Florida, California, Tennessee, and Texas.

== History ==
NeoGenomics first received state and national-level laboratory certifications in 2002. Three years later in 2005, the company developed a technical-only service model using FISH.

In 2013, the company launched its sequencing platform and was listed on the Nasdaq Stock Market as NEO. In 2014, NeoGenomics launched molecular tests including BTK and CALR mutation analysis.

In 2015, NeoGenomics acquired Clarient, Inc. and its subsidiary company, Clarient Diagnostic Services, Inc., a national cancer diagnostics laboratory with capabilities in immunohistochemistry for solid tumor cancers from GE Healthcare. Clarient is headquartered in Aliso Viejo, California; with an ancillary laboratory in Houston, Texas.

In November 2017, NeoGenomics established their first headquarters outside the United States in Rolle, Switzerland.

In September 2024, the District Court for the Middle District of North Carolina entered a permanent injunction against NeoGenomics’ accused RaDaR assay, which was preliminarily enjoined in December 2023.
