= Sink test =

Type of laboratory fraud

Sink test is a form of medical laboratory diagnostics healthcare fraud whereby clinical specimens are discarded, via a sink drain, and fabricated results are reported, without the clinical specimen actually being tested.

In the United States, the prevalence of sink test laboratories in the 1980s led in part to regulation following the passage of Clinical Laboratory Improvement Amendments in 1988.

While this illegal practice still occurs, it is rare within the highly regulated US lab market.
