= Individualized Quality Control Plan =

The Individualized Quality Control Plan (IQCP) is a quality management system consisting of a Risk Assessment (RA), Quality Control Plan (QCP), and Quality Assessment (QA), under the US Clinical Laboratory Improvement Amendments (CLIA) federal regulatory standards. It is designed to enable regulated medical laboratories to manage the frequency of their quality control.

Beginning Jan 1, 2016, US laboratories under CLIA performing non-waived testing were required to either perform two levels of controls daily or implement an IQCP. An IQCP may be less stringent than CLIA, but not less stringent than the manufacturers recommendation. IQCPs were introduced in 2013 enabling a transition period.

An IQCP is based on a laboratory's own data and includes a risk assessment of potential errors in the preanalytical, analytical, and postanalytical phases and the likelihood and impact of potential patient harm for each error.

== History ==
In 2012, the ISO 14971:2012 was published.

In 2013, the CLIA Interpretive Guidelines were updated to include risk assessment for all aspects of laboratory testing.

In 2014, the Individualized Quality Control Plan (IQCP) was introduced and laboratories would have a 2-year transition period, from January 1, 2014, to December 31, 2015, to move away from Equivalent Quality Control (EQC) and either perform the default CLIA frequency for daily QC or implement an IQCP. However, IQCP was initially presented as "optional" or "voluntary" limiting adoption. It was not until mid-2015 and that it was clarified that EQC would be formally phased out that IQCP would not optional that laboratories began to implement IQCP.
