= National Commission for Allied and Healthcare Professions =

Indian regulatory body

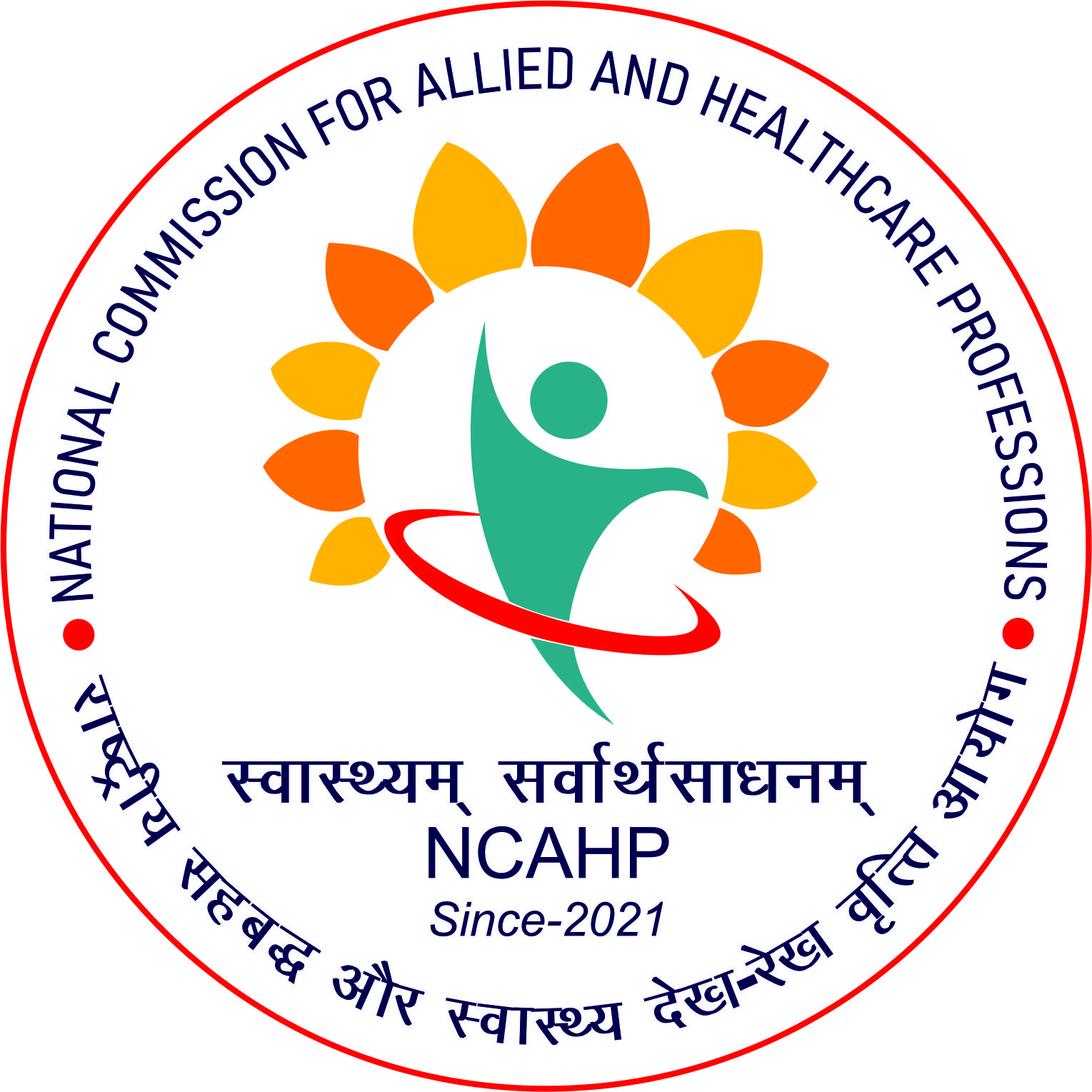
- Abbreviation: NCAHP
- Type: Statutory body
- Purpose: Allied and Healthcare Professions Regulatory Agency
- Headquarters: NIHFW Campus, 2nd floor, Baba GangNath Marg, Munirka, New Delhi-110067
- Chairman: Dr. Yagna Unmesh Shukla PhD
- Main organ: Commission
- Affiliations: Ministry of Health and Family Welfare
- Website: https://ncahp.abdm.gov.in/

The National Commission for Allied and Healthcare Professions (NCAHP) is the Indian regulatory body for allied and healthcare professionals (A&HP). It covers all Allied health professionals and healthcare professionals who were not covered under National Medical Commission, Dental Council of India, Indian Nursing Council, Pharmacy Council of India, Rehabilitation Council of India (RCI) etc till 2021 and groups all into ten categories with power to regulate education and professionals of all ten categories. The NCAHP official website was launched on 29 October 2024.

== Implementation ==
In March 2026, India House submitted a report, 'Strengthening Allied & Healthcare Capacity', to the MoH&FW and NCAHP. The report discussed implementation challenges in allied and healthcare reforms, including registration pathways, university alignment, and clinical training infrastructure.

== Ten recognised categories ==
The National Commission for Allied and Healthcare Professions Act, 2021 defined (Note: (c) "allied and healthcare professional" means any allied health professional or healthcare professional under this Act; (d) "allied health professional" includes an associate, technician or technologist who is trained to perform any technical and practical task to support diagnosis and treatment of illness, disease, injury or impairment, and to support implementation of any healthcare treatment and referral plan recommended by a medical, nursing or any other healthcare professional, and who has obtained any qualification of diploma or degree under this Act, the duration of which shall not be less than two thousand hours spread over a period of two years to four years divided into specific semesters; (j) "healthcare professional" includes a scientist, therapist or other professional who studies, advises, researches, supervises or provides preventive, curative, rehabilitative, therapeutic or promotional health services and who has obtained any qualification of degree under this Act, the duration of which shall not be less than three thousand six hundred hours spread over a period of three years to six years divided into specific semesters;) "Allied health professionals" and "healthcare professionals" in India and placed them in the following categories:

1. Medical Laboratory and Life Sciences
2. Trauma, Burn Care and Surgical/Anesthesia related technology
3. Physiotherapy Professional
4. Nutrition Science Professional
5. Ophthalmic Sciences Professional
6. Occupational Therapy Professional
7. Community Care, Behavioural Health Sciences and other Professionals
8. Medical Radiology, Imaging and Therapeutic Technology Professional
9. Medical Technologists and Physician Associate
10. Health Information Management and Health Informatic Professional

== Professions not included by the Act ==
The following groups were not included in the Act. They are covered by the National Medical Commission, Dental Council of India, Indian Nursing Council, and Pharmacy Council of India, Rehabilitation Council of India and possess degrees, or an equivalent degree, in the following:

- Dentistry
- Medicine
- Nursing
- Pharmacy
- Speech Language Pathology
- Audiology
- Clinical psychologist

== Ten Professional Councils Under NCAHP ==
The ten councils under the National Commission for Allied and Healthcare Professions are:

1. Medical Laboratory and Life Sciences Professional Council

2. Trauma, Burn Care and Surgical/Anesthesia Related Technology Professional Council

3. Physiotherapy Professional Council

4. Nutrition Science Professional Council

5. Ophthalmic Science Professional Council

6. Occupational Therapy Professional Council

7. Community Care, Behavioural Health & Other Professionals Professional Council

8. Medical Radiology, Imaging & Therapeutic Technology Professional Council

9. Medical Technology & Physician Associates, Biomedical & Medical Equipment Technology Professional Council

10. Health Information Management & Health Informatics Professional Council
