= American Association of Bioanalysts =

The American Association of Bioanalysts (AAB) is a professional association for clinical laboratory scientists, clinical laboratory supervisors, clinical laboratory directors, and clinical laboratory consultants. Its office is based in St. Louis, Missouri, US. It was founded in 1956.

== History ==
The organization was formed in 1956 when the Council of American Bioanalysts (CAB) merged with the National Association of Clinical Laboratories (NACL) The AAB serves as an umbrella organization for the American Board of Bioanalysis, AAB Board of Registry AAB Associate Member Section, College of Reproductive Biology Environmental Biology and Public Health Section and National Independent Laboratory Association.

In 1999, the International Society for Clinical Laboratory Technologists (ISCLT) merged with the American Association of Bioanalysts. Founded in 1962, the credentialing commission of the ISCLT certified medical technologists under Registered Medical Technologist RMT (ISCLT).

== Role as a national certifying agency ==
The American Board of Bioanalysis, is a national certifying agency in the United States of America, for clinical laboratory directors and supervisors. The AAB Board of Registry is a national certifying agency in the United States of America for medical technologist and medical laboratory technicians. Those certified either meet or exceed the minimum requirements for testing personnel under Clinical Laboratory Improvement Amendments.

=== AAB Board of Registry ===
The AAB Board of Registry (ABOR) has the following bench level certifications:

AAB Board of Registry (ABOR) Certifications
Name	Designation	Notes
Medical Technologist	MT(AAB)	
Molecular Diagnostics Technologist	MDxT(AAB)	
Andrology Laboratory Scientist	ALS(AAB)	
Embryology Laboratory Scientist	ELS(AAB)	
Medical Laboratory Technician	MLT(AAB)	

=== American Board of Bioanalysis (ABB) ===
The American Board of Bioanalysis (ABB) has the following supervisory level certifications:

American Board of Bioanalysis (ABB) Certifications
Name	Designation	Notes
High Complexity Clinical Laboratory Director	HCLD(ABB)	
Technical Supervisor	TS(ABB)	
Embryology Laboratory Director	ELD(ABB)	
Andrology Laboratory Director	ALD(ABB)	
Bioanalyst Clinical Laboratory Director	BCLD(ABB)	
Public Health Laboratory Director	PHLD(ABB)	
Clinical Consultant	CC(ABB)	
Bioanalyst Clinical Laboratory Director (BCLD)	BCLD(ABB)	
General Supervisor	GS(ABB)	

== Role as a trade association ==
The National Independent Laboratory Association (NILA) functions as a trade association for community, regional, and health systems clinical laboratories. NILA has a long history of defending the clinical laboratory industry from legislation that would be detrimental and costly to both the clinical laboratory and patients in the United States. One of their first victories prevented the reinstatement of the 20% copayment on Part B Clinical Laboratory Fee Schedule (CLFS) payments. The organization is currently playing a role in preventing PAMA's proposed fee cuts

== State Licensure ==
The AAB officially supports state licensure for clinical laboratory personnel, but opposes laws it considers excessively restrictive. In 2014, the AAB clarified its licensure position in a response to Minnesota's H.F. 203 bill. AAB opposed the bill on the basis that it would create a hardship for United States trained military personnel to obtain a license, lead to creating loopholes where new standards would apply to only some of Minnesota's laboratories, and encouragedifferent wages based on education instead of work performed. The bill was successfully defeated allowing United States trained military personnel to continue working without additional education and training requirements.
