= American Board of Clinical Chemistry =

Doctoral board certification agency

The American Board of Clinical Chemistry (ABCC) is an American doctoral board certification agency for clinical chemistry, toxicological chemistry, and molecular diagnostics. It was founded in 1950 with sponsorship from the American Chemical Society (ACS), American Institute of Chemists (AIC), and the American Society of Biological Chemists. The American Association of Clinical Chemists (AACC) began sponsoring the board in 1954.

Certificants are eligible to practice as CLIA high complexity laboratory directors (HCLD) and clinical consultants (CC).

== Certifications ==
American Board of Clinical Chemistry (ABCC) Certifications
Certification Diplomate	Designation	Year Started	Notes
Clinical Chemistry Diplomate	DABCC (CC)		
Molecular Diagnostics Diplomate	DABCC (MD)		
Toxicological Chemistry Diplomate	DABCC (TC)		
