= Molecular diagnostics =

Collection of techniques used to analyze biological markers in the genome and proteome

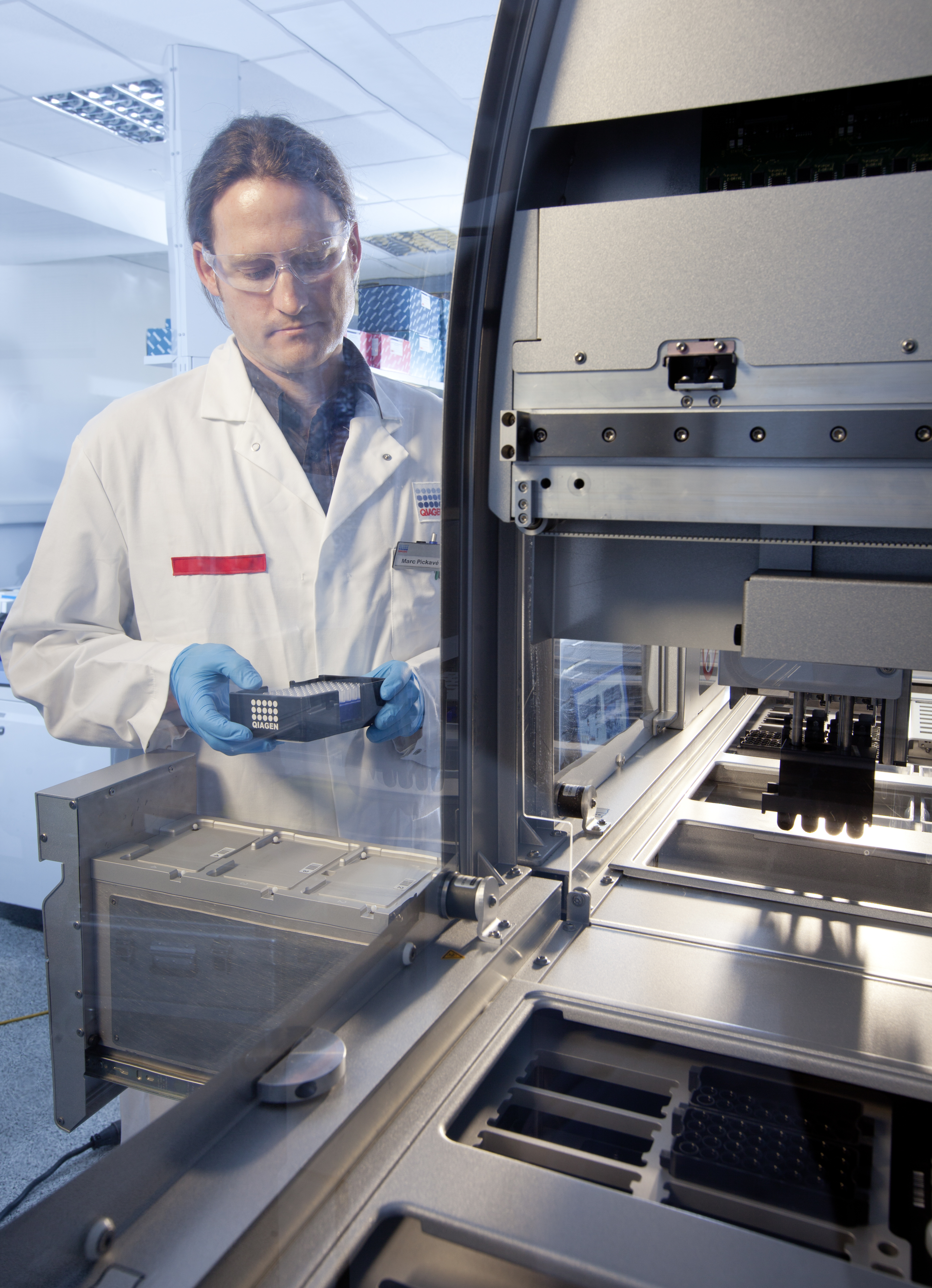
Specialist using "QIAsymphony", an automation platform for molecular diagnostic tests

Molecular diagnostics is a collection of techniques used to analyze biological markers in the genome and proteome, and how their cells express their genes as proteins, applying molecular biology to medical testing. In medicine the technique is used to diagnose and monitor disease, detect risk, and decide which therapies will work best for individual patients, and in agricultural biosecurity similarly to monitor crop- and livestock disease, estimate risk, and decide what quarantine measures must be taken.

By analysing the specifics of the patient and their disease, molecular diagnostics offers the prospect of personalised medicine. These tests are useful in a range of medical specialties, including infectious disease, oncology, human leucocyte antigen typing (which investigates and predicts immune function), coagulation, and pharmacogenomics—the genetic prediction of which drugs will work best. They overlap with clinical chemistry (medical tests on bodily fluids).

== History ==
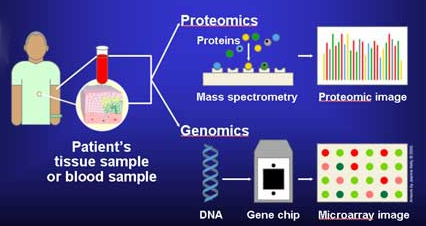
Molecular diagnostics uses techniques such as mass spectrometry and gene chips to capture the expression patterns of genes and proteins

The field of molecular biology grew in the late twentieth century, as did its clinical application. In 1980, Yuet Wai Kan et al. suggested a prenatal genetic test for Thalassemia that did not rely upon DNA sequencing—then in its infancy—but on restriction enzymes that cut DNA where they recognised specific short sequences, creating different lengths of DNA strand depending on which allele (genetic variation) the fetus possessed. In the 1980s, the phrase was used in the names of companies such as Molecular Diagnostics Incorporated and Bethseda Research Laboratories Molecular Diagnostics.

During the 1990s, the identification of newly discovered genes and new techniques for DNA sequencing led to the appearance of a distinct field of molecular and genomic laboratory medicine; in 1995, the Association for Molecular Pathology (AMP) was formed to give it structure. In 1999, the AMP co-founded The Journal of Medical Diagnostics. Informa Healthcare launched Expert Reviews in Medical Diagnostics in 2001. From 2002 onwards, the HapMap Project aggregated information on the one-letter genetic differences that recur in the human population—the single nucleotide polymorphisms—and their relationship with disease. In 2012, molecular diagnostic techniques for Thalassemia use genetic hybridization tests to identify the specific single nucleotide polymorphism causing an individual's disease.

As the commercial application of molecular diagnostics has become more important, so has the debate about patenting of the genetic discoveries at its heart. In 1998, the European Union's Directive 98/44/ECclarified that patents on DNA sequences were allowable. In 2010 in the US, AMP sued Myriad Genetics to challenge the latter's patents regarding two genes, BRCA1, BRCA2, which are associated with breast cancer. In 2013, the U.S. Supreme Court partially agreed, ruling that a naturally occurring gene sequence could not be patented.

== Techniques ==
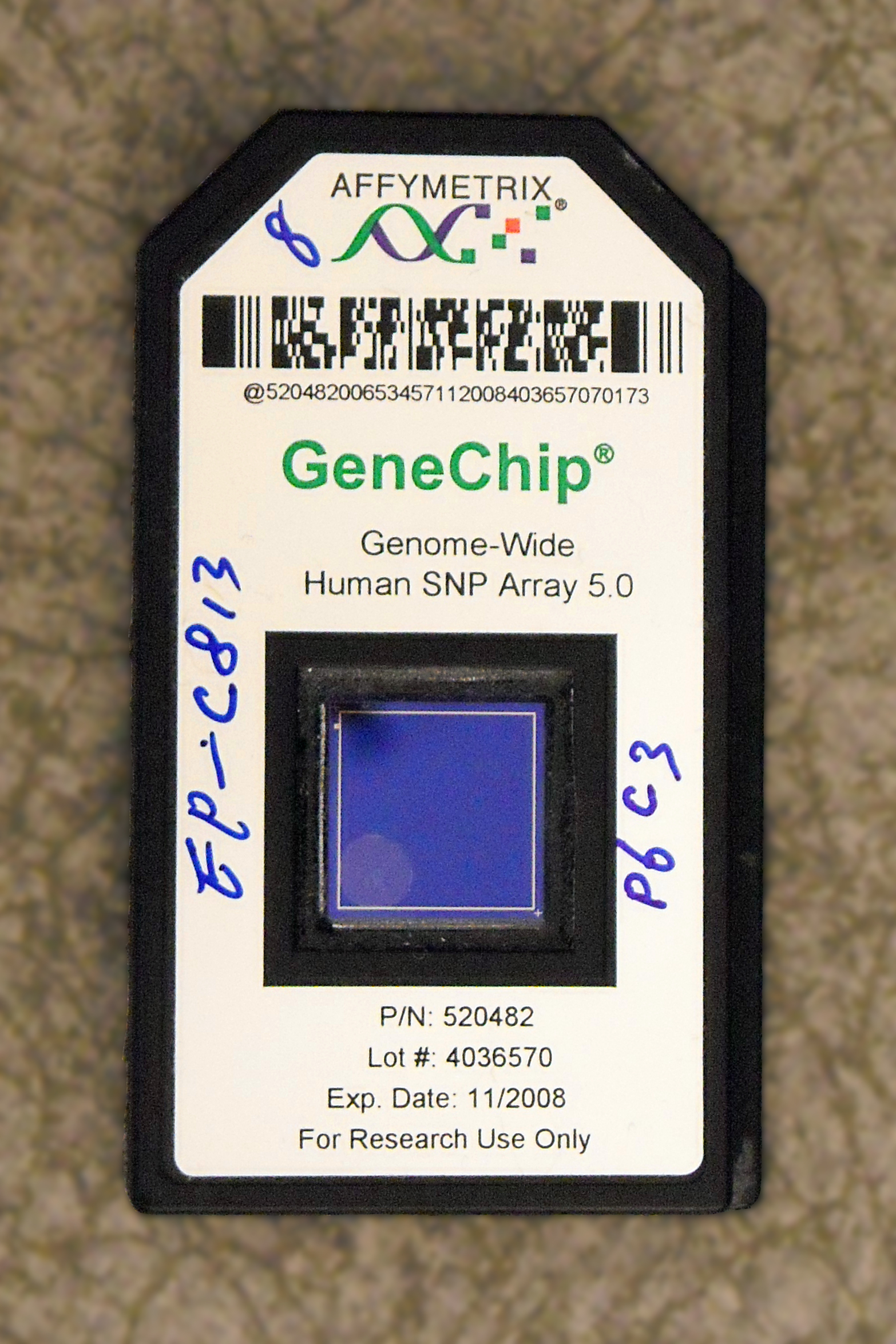
The Affymetrix 5.0, a microarray chip

=== Development from research tools ===
The industrialisation of molecular biology assay tools has made it practical to use them in clinics. Miniaturisation into a single handheld device can bring medical diagnostics into the clinic and into the office or home. The clinical laboratory requires high standards of reliability; diagnostics may require accreditation or fall under medical device regulations. As of 2011, some US clinical laboratories nevertheless used assays sold for "research use only".

Laboratory processes need to adhere to regulations, such as the Clinical Laboratory Improvement Amendments, Health Insurance Portability and Accountability Act, Good Laboratory Practice, and Food and Drug Administration specifications in the United States. Laboratory Information Management Systems help by tracking these processes. Regulation applies to both staff and supplies. As of 2012, twelve US states require molecular pathologists to be licensed; several boards such as the American Board of Medical Genetics and the American Board of Pathology certify technologists, supervisors, and laboratory directors.

Automation and sample barcoding maximise throughput and reduce the possibility of error or contamination during manual handling and results reporting. Single devices to do the assay from beginning to end are now available.

=== Assays ===
Molecular diagnostics uses in vitro biological assays such as PCR-ELISA or Fluorescence in situ hybridization. The assay detects a molecule, often in low concentrations, that is a marker of disease or risk in a sample taken from a patient. Preservation of the sample before analysis is critical. Manual handling should be minimised. The fragile RNA molecule poses certain challenges. As part of the cellular process of expressing genes as proteins, it offers a measure of gene expression but it is vulnerable to hydrolysis and breakdown by ever-present RNAse enzymes. Samples can be snap-frozen in liquid nitrogen or incubated in preservation agents.

Because molecular diagnostics methods can detect sensitive markers, these tests are less intrusive than a traditional biopsy. For example, because cell-free nucleic acids exist in human plasma, a simple blood sample can be enough to sample genetic information from tumours, transplants or an unborn fetus. Many, but not all, molecular diagnostics methods based on nucleic acids detection use polymerase chain reaction (PCR) to vastly increase the number of nucleic acid molecules, thereby amplifying the target sequence(s) in the patient sample. PCR is a method that a template DNA is amplified using synthetic primers, a DNA polymerase, and dNTPs. The mixture is cycled between at least 2 temperatures: a high temperature for denaturing double-stranded DNA into single-stranded molecules and a low temperature for the primer to hybridize to the template and for the polymerase to extend the primer. Each temperature cycle theoretically doubles the quantity of target sequence. Detection of sequence variations using PCR typically involves the design and use oligonucleotide reagents that amplify the variant of interest more efficiently than wildtype sequence. PCR is currently the most widely used method for detection of DNA sequences. The detection of the marker might use real time PCR, direct sequencing, microarray chips—prefabricated chips that test many markers at once, or MALDI-TOF The same principle applies to the proteome and the genome. High-throughput protein arrays can use complementary DNA or antibodies to bind and hence can detect many different proteins in parallel. Molecular diagnostic tests vary widely in sensitivity, turn around time, cost, coverage and regulatory approval. They also vary in the level of validation applied in the laboratories using them. Hence, robust local validation in accordance with the regulatory requirements and use of appropriate controls is required especially where the result may be used to inform a patient treatment decision.

== Benefits ==
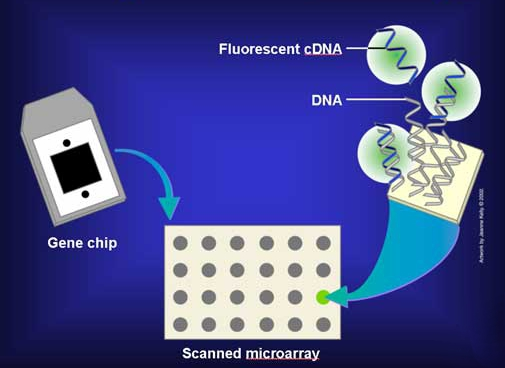
A microarray chip contains complementary DNA (cDNA) to many sequences of interest. The cDNA fluoresces when it hybridises with a matching DNA fragment in the sample.

=== Prenatal ===
Conventional prenatal tests for chromosomal abnormalities such as Down syndrome rely on analysing the number and appearance of the chromosomes—the karyotype. Molecular diagnostics tests such as microarray comparative genomic hybridisation test a sample of DNA instead, and because of cell-free DNA in plasma, could be less invasive, but as of 2013 it is still an adjunct to the conventional tests.

Preimplantation genetic diagnosis is used to detect serious and incurable genetic disorders that may be transmitted from parents to their offspring. This technique is performed as part of in vitro fertilization (IVF), through the genetic analysis of embryonic cells before embryo transfer into the uterus. The early identification of disease-causing mutations can prevent a future need of a pregnancy termination.

=== Treatment ===
Some of a patient's single nucleotide polymorphisms—slight differences in their DNA—can help predict how quickly they will metabolise particular drugs; this is called pharmacogenomics. For example, the enzyme CYP2C19 metabolises several drugs, such as the anti-clotting agent Clopidogrel, into their active forms. Some patients possess polymorphisms in specific places on the 2C19 gene that make poor metabolisers of those drugs; physicians can test for these polymorphisms and find out whether the drugs will be fully effective for that patient. Advances in molecular biology have helped show that some syndromes that were previously classed as a single disease are actually multiple subtypes with entirely different causes and treatments. Molecular diagnostics can help diagnose the subtype—for example of infections and cancers—or the genetic analysis of a disease with an inherited component, such as Silver-Russell syndrome.

=== Infectious disease ===
Molecular diagnostics are used to identify infectious diseases such as chlamydia, influenza virus and tuberculosis; or specific strains such as H1N1 virus or SARS-CoV-2. Genetic identification can be swift; for example a loop-mediated isothermal amplification test diagnoses the malaria parasite and is rugged enough for developing countries. But despite these advances in genome analysis, in 2013 infections are still more often identified by other means—their proteome, bacteriophage, or chromatographic profile. Molecular diagnostics are also used to understand the specific strain of the pathogen—for example by detecting which drug resistance genes it possesses—and hence which therapies to avoid. In addition, assays based on metagenomic next generation sequencing can be implemented to identify pathogenic organisms without bias.

=== Disease risk management ===
A patient's genome may include an inherited or random mutation which affects the probability of developing a disease in the future. For example, Lynch syndrome is a genetic disease that predisposes patients to colorectal and other cancers; early detection can lead to close monitoring that improves the patient's chances of a good outcome. Cardiovascular risk is indicated by biological markers and screening can measure the risk that a child will be born with a genetic disease such as Cystic fibrosis. Genetic testing is ethically complex: patients may not want the stress of knowing their risk. In countries without universal healthcare, a known risk may raise insurance premiums.

=== Cancer ===
Cancer is a change in the cellular processes that cause a tumour to grow out of control. Cancerous cells sometimes have mutations in oncogenes, such as KRAS and CTNNB1 (β-catenin). Analysing the molecular signature of cancerous cells—the DNA and its levels of expression via messenger RNA—enables physicians to characterise the cancer and to choose the best therapy for their patients. As of 2010, assays that incorporate an array of antibodies against specific protein marker molecules are an emerging technology; there are hopes for these multiplex assays that could measure many markers at once. Other potential future biomarkers include micro RNA molecules, which cancerous cells express more of than healthy ones.

Cancer is a disease with excessive molecular causes and constant evolution. There's also heterogeneity of disease even in an individual. Molecular studies of cancer have proved the significance of driver mutations in the growth and metastasis of tumors. Many technologies for detection of sequence variations have been developed for cancer research. These technologies generally can be grouped into three approaches: polymerase chain reaction (PCR), hybridization, and next-generation sequencing (NGS). Currently, a lot of PCR and hybridization assays have been approved by FDA as in vitro diagnostics. NGS assays, however, are still at an early stage in clinical diagnostics.

To do the molecular diagnostic test for cancer, one of the significant issue is the DNA sequence variation detection. Tumor biopsy samples used for diagnostics always contain as little as 5% of the target variant as compared to wildtype sequence. Also, for noninvasive applications from peripheral blood or urine, the DNA test must be specific enough to detect mutations at variant allele frequencies of less than 0.1%.

Currently, by optimizing the traditional PCR, there's a new invention, amplification-refractory mutation system (ARMS) is a method for detecting DNA sequence variants in cancer. The principle behind ARMS is that the enzymatic extension activity of DNA polymerases is highly sensitive to mismatches near the 3' end of primer. Many different companies have developed diagnostics tests based on ARMS PCR primers. For instance, Qiagen therascreen, Roche cobas and Biomerieux THxID have developed FDA approved PCR tests for detecting lung, colon cancer and metastatic melanoma mutations in the KRAS, EGFR and BRAF genes. Their IVD kits were basically validated on genomic DNA extracted from FFPE tissue.

There are also microarrays that utilize hybridization mechanism to diagnose cancer. More than a million of different probes can be synthesized on an array with Affymetrix's Genechip technology with a detection limit of one to ten copies of mRNA per well. Optimized microarrays are typically considered to produce repeatable relative quantitation of different targets. Currently, FDA have already approved a number of diagnostics assays utilizing microarrays: Agendia's MammaPrint assays can inform the breast cancer recurrence risk by profiling the expression of 70 genes related to breast cancer; Autogenomics INFNITI CYP2C19 assay can profile genetic polymorphisms, whose impacts on therapeutic response to antidepressants are great; and Affymetrix's CytoScan Dx can evaluate intellectual disabilities and congenital disorders by analyzing chromosomal mutation.

In the future, the diagnostic tools for cancer will likely to focus on the Next Generation Sequencing (NGS). By utilizing DNA and RNA sequencing to do cancer diagnostics, technology in the field of molecular diagnostics tools will develop better. Although NGS throughput and price have dramatically been reduced over the past 10 years by roughly 100-fold, we remain at least 6 orders of magnitude away from performing deep sequencing at a whole genome level. Currently, Ion Torrent developed some NGS panels based on translational AmpliSeq, for example, the Oncomine Comprehensive Assay. They are focusing on utilizing deep sequencing of cancer-related genes to detect rare sequence variants.

Molecular diagnostics tool can be used for cancer risk assessment. For example, the BRCA1/2 test by Myriad Genetics assesses women for lifetime risk of breast cancer. Also, some cancers are not always employed with clear symptoms. It is useful to analyze people when they do not show obvious symptoms and thus can detect cancer at early stages. For example, the ColoGuard test may be used to screen people over 55 years old for colorectal cancer. Cancer is a longtime-scale disease with various progression steps, molecular diagnostics tools can be used for prognosis of cancer progression. For example, the OncoType Dx test by Genomic Health can estimate risk of breast cancer. Their technology can inform patients to seek chemotherapy when necessary by examining the RNA expression levels in breast cancer biopsy tissue.

With rising government support in DNA molecular diagnostics, it is expected that an increasing number of clinical DNA detection assays for cancers will become available soon. Currently, research in cancer diagnostics are developing fast with goals for lower cost, less time consumption and simpler methods for doctors and patients.

=== Allergy ===
Molecular diagnostics is increasingly used in allergology, especially for food and respiratory allergy. Conventional diagnosis is based on clinical history, skin-prick testing and measurement of serum allergen-specific IgE to whole allergen extracts. Molecular-based allergy diagnostics, also called component-resolved diagnostics, measures IgE to individual allergen molecules rather than only to extracts. This can help distinguish genuine sensitization from cross-reactivity, refine assessment of clinical risk in some allergies, and support decisions about allergen immunotherapy. Multiplex platforms, such as Allergy Explorer (ALEX), can test IgE reactivity to many allergen extracts and molecular components in a single assay. Precision allergy molecular diagnosis (PAMD®) is a broader diagnostic approach using molecular IgE profiles to guide prognosis, risk assessment and personalized management, although results must be interpreted together with the patient’s clinical history.

== See also ==
- Molecular medicine (the broader field of the molecular understanding of disease)
- Molecular pathology
- Laboratory Developed Test
- Pathogenesis
- Pathogenomics
- Pathology
- Precision medicine
- Personalized medicine
