= Clinical Laboratory Improvement Amendments =

United States federal regulatory standards

The Clinical Laboratory Improvement Amendments (CLIA) of 1988 are United States federal regulatory standards that apply to all clinical laboratory testing performed on humans in the United States, except clinical trials and basic research.

== CLIA Program ==
In accordance with the CLIA, the CLIA Program sets standards and issues certificates for clinical laboratory testing. CLIA defines a clinical laboratory as any facility which performs laboratory testing on specimens derived from humans for the purpose of providing information for:

- diagnosis, prevention, or treatment of disease or impairment
- health assessments

An objective of the CLIA is to ensure the accuracy, reliability, and timeliness of test results regardless of where the test was performed. Most laboratory-developed tests have been regulated under this program. In 2014, the FDA started a public discussion about regulating some LDTs.

== Test complexity ==
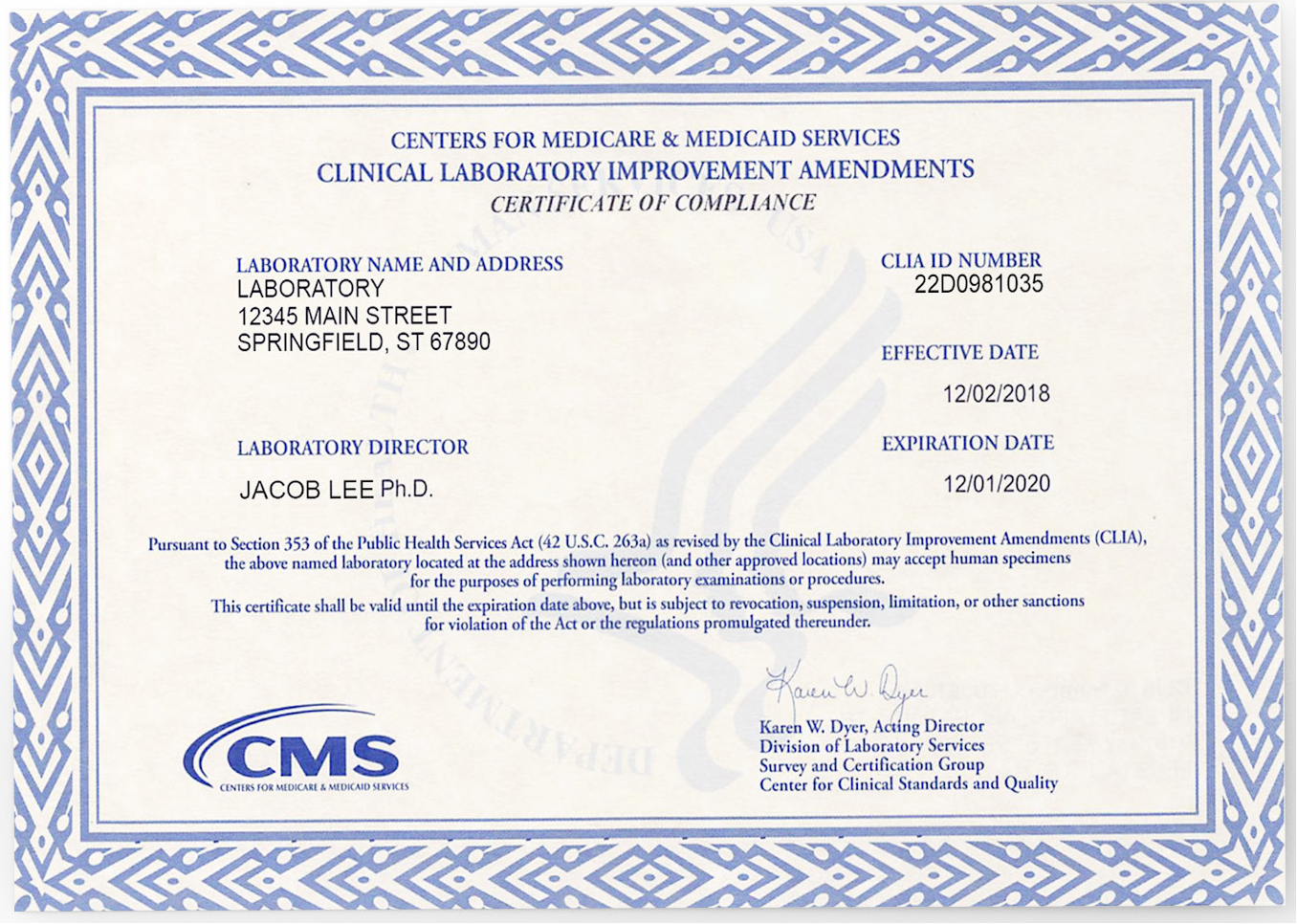
A CLIA Certificate of Compliance (CoC)

Per CLIA, each specific laboratory system, assay, examination is graded for level of complexity by assigning scores of 1, 2, or 3 for each of the following seven criteria. A score of 1 is the lowest level of complexity, and a score of 3 is the highest. Score 2 is assigned when the characteristics for a particular test are intermediate between the descriptions listed for scores of 1 and 3.

Criteria for categorization:

1. Knowledge
2. Training and experience
3. Reagents and materials preparation
4. Characteristics of operational steps
5. Calibration, quality control, and proficiency testing materials
6. Test system troubleshooting and equipment maintenance
7. Interpretation and judgment

The Centers for Medicare & Medicaid Services (CMS) has the primary responsibility for the operation of the CLIA Program. Within CMS, the program is implemented by the Center for Medicaid and State Operations, Survey and Certification Group, and the Division of Laboratory Services.

List of CLIA test complexity categorizations:

- Waived
- Moderate
- Provider-performed microscopy (PPM)
- High
  - Laboratory-developed test (LDTs)

=== Complementary and alternative medicine laboratories ===
Complementary and alternative medicine tests, such as live blood analysis (LBA), biological terrain assessment (BTA), dental sensitivity testing, and cytotoxic testing have not been categorized by the CDC, and are thus treated as high complexity laboratory developed tests. CAM tests are often ordered by chiropractors, naturopaths, and nutritionists and accompanied by non-validated clinical interpretations which are used to recommend or justify costly, unnecessary, and potentially damaging treatments. A 2001 OIG report found that the majority of laboratories performing CAM tests were not enrolled in CLIA and that CAM laboratory personnel did not meet the high complexity qualifications. For laboratories enrolled in CLIA, they had their certificates revoked or were sent deficiency notices for failing to adhere to CLIA regulations. No CLIA laboratory has been able to validate its LBA CAM tests per standards. CAM tests are not covered by health insurance. The number of CAM laboratories is unknown; the sales of supplemental remedies based on the results of these tests is unknown. Since CLIA does not regulate the clinical validity/usefulness of a test, it is possible for a CLIA laboratory to offer tests that have no clinical utility.

Getting laboratories that conduct CAM testing to enroll in CLIA is itself a challenge. Medical laboratories enroll in CLIA to qualify for Medicare/Medicaid reimbursement; nearly all providers bill patients directly for CAM laboratory tests. Additionally, CAM providers are concerned by the closure of other CAM laboratories under CLIA, and have sought to avoid detection. Some CAM providers and laboratory personnel have not had exposure to laboratory curriculum and are unaware of CLIA requirements. CLIA is largely reliant on laboratories to self-identify themselves for enrollment.

Providers of CAM laboratories have opposed CLIA oversight and suggested they be regulated by their peers or by a CAM-specific division. CAM providers have stated that they should be exempt from CLIA since CAM laboratories do not participate in health insurance. Others claim that they are exempt from CLIA because the tests are performed solely for research purposes and not used in patient care and treatment decisions. Several pathologists have stated that CAM testing falls within the scope of their medical license and should not be regulated under CLIA.

CLIA provisions are geared towards CLIA-certified laboratories, but not for those that have not enrolled. When a CAM laboratory is found to be operating without a CLIA certificate, they are sent a cease and desist letter to stop testing until the laboratory is CLIA certified. There are no administrative remedies available to CMS when a laboratory refuses to enroll in CLIA and refuses to cease testing. CMS cannot impose monetary or other administrative penalties on laboratories that defy the law, but can only refer cases to other Federal or State agencies. CMS plays the primary role in federal oversight of laboratories under CLIA, and there are limited regulations at the state level that restrict CAM laboratories.

=== Andrology and embryology laboratories and reproductive tissue banks ===
CLIA applies to sperm analysis and the postcoital test, but does not apply to andrology or embryology laboratories, to testing performed as part of an assisted reproductive technology (ART), or to reproductive tissue banks. There are no federal personnel requirements.

The lack of CLIA applicability has been criticized noting how semen analysis is categorized as a high complexity test whereas the analysis of oocytes and embryos is unregulated, despite similar equipment and techniques in use. There are accreditation programs such as the CAP/ASRM Reproductive Laboratory Accreditation Program (RLAP), and TJC and CAP offer specialty accreditations, but these are voluntary in nature.

In the summer of 1991, HHS notified the American Society of Reproductive Medicine (ASRM) and the Society for Assisted Reproductive Technology (SART) that in vitro fertilisation (IVF) and gamete intrafallopian transfer (GIFT) laboratories were to be covered under CLIA '88. However, when CLIA '88 was published on February 28, 1992, it did not explicitly mention andrology and embryology laboratories creating uncertainty in regulatory oversight. In 1992, Senator Ron Wyden (D-OR) introduced the Fertility Clinic Success Rate and Certification Act (FCRCA), colloquially called the "Wyden bill", requiring the Disease Control and Prevention (CDC) to develop a model program for the certification of embryo laboratories, to be carried out voluntarily by interested states. This created initial confusion as to whether CLIA was applicable. In 1994, HCFA stated that in vitro fertilization was categorized as a therapeutic procedure, not a diagnostic procedure, and therefore not covered under CLIA. As such, AAB/ABB took the position that IVF laboratory tests are covered under CLIA, while ASRM and SART took the opposing position. On September 16, 1998, the Clinical Laboratory Improvement Advisory Committee (CLIAC) made a non-binding recommendation that CLIA coverage apply to embryology laboratories and suggested the College of American Pathologists (CAP) and ASRM accreditation checklist. However, the United States Secretary of Health and Human Services Donna Shalala did not implement the recommendation prompting the AAB to sue HHS to force a decision on March 16, 1999. In response, ASRM filed an amicus brief opposing AAB's lawsuit. On March 8, 2000, the lawsuit was dismissed by Thomas F. Hogan due to lack of standing.

In 1994, the American Board of Bioanalysis (ABB) created the first CLIA-approved HCLD board exam for andrologists and embryologists.

== Fees/Funding ==
The CLIA Program is funded by user fees collected from approximately 200,000 laboratories, most located in the United States.

== CLIA-waived tests ==
Under CLIA, tests and test systems that meet risk, error, and complexity requirements are issued a CLIA certificate of waiver. In November 2007, the CLIA waiver provisions were revised by the United States Congress to make it clear that tests approved by the FDA for home use automatically qualify for CLIA waiver, although many waived tests are not done according to designed protocols – more than 50% of such tests are done incorrectly – and result in medical errors, some with fatal consequences.

== Record and specimen retention ==
CLIA and the College of American Pathologists (CAP) have written policies for the minimum period that laboratories should keep laboratory records and materials, with some examples as follows:

Microscopy slides	Histology and non-forensic autopsy	10 years
Microscopy slides	Forensic autopsy	Indefinitely
Microscopy slides	Cytology, fine needle aspiration	10 years
Microscopy slides	Cytology, apart from fine needle aspiration	5 years
Paraffin-embedded blocks	Non-forensic	2 or 10 years
Paraffin-embedded blocks	Forensic	Indefinitely
Requisition form and test report	Pathology reports	10 years
Requisition form and test report	Other	2 years
Blood bank records	Quality control records	5 years
Blood bank records	Donor and recipient records	10 years
Blood bank records	Records of indefinitely deferred donors	Indefinitely
Wet tissues		Until report is completed or 2 weeks thereafter
Proficiency testing records and quality management/quality control records		2 years
Discontinued procedures		2 years
Blood smears and other body fluid smears, microbiology slides (including Gram stains)		7 days
Flow cytometry plots		10 years

During the retention period, specimens are considered part of the medical record and must be kept in a CLIA-accredited laboratory to ensure compliant handling and storage conditions. If a specimen is sent out to a non-CLIA biorepository and recalled, the additional testing would not be in compliance. There is an effort to make more biobanks CLIA equivalent as specimen recalls become more common due to expanded testing.

=== Specimen ownership and utilization ===
Although CLIA specifies minimum retention periods, it does not explicitly state which entity retains ownership of the specimen during retention and after the retention period. The US currently lacks well-defined federal regulations governing the ownership and use of physical human tissue specimens, their derivatives, and the biological information they contain. The current standing by bioethicists is that patients who have consented to have their diagnostic specimens collected have also abandoned them, and thus have no ownership rights. The Common Rule permits the use of biospecimens that would otherwise be discarded, provided that the donor can not be identified, though utilization of the materials for research may require Institutional review board (IRB) approval. The Association of American Medical Colleges (AAMC) has taken the stance that it "unambiguously rejects the concept that individuals retain any property interest in their excised tissues."

Proponents of patient ownership rights advocate that patients must own their samples so that they can make informed decisions about how the tissues will be used, such as in bioweapons development, stem cell research, and for-profit ventures. The 21st Century Cures Act enacted in December 2016 allows researchers to waive the requirement for informed consent when clinical testing "poses no more than minimal risk" and "includes appropriate safeguards to protect the rights, safety, and welfare of the human subject."

The probability that a patient may sue researchers who utilize tissues that would typically be discarded is low, but as genetic research becomes more prevalent, this likelihood may increase. Ideally, researchers should obtain informed consent from individuals and aim for transparency in their intended use of the human tissue while protecting the privacy of the donor.

CAP and other laboratory accreditation organizations (AO) have additional requirements and protocols for repurposing biospecimens that would otherwise be discarded.

In July 2011, an Advance Notice of Proposed Rule Making (ANPRM), entitled "Human Subjects Research Protections: Enhancing Protections for Research Subjects and Reducing Burden, Delay, and Ambiguity for Investigators" was published in the Federal Register.

The rise in direct-to-consumer (DTC) genetic testing has raised concerns about the secondary use of both patient samples and their data.

==== Newborn screening card retention & utilization ====
These newborn screening DNA databases make a complete mockery of informed consent. What people also don't know is...it is done by the state department of public health.

— Jeremy Gruber, Council for Responsible Genetics

In the US, newborn screening (NBS) is mandated in all states, though in some states parents may decline it for religious or philosophical reasons. Few parents opt for the program due to health concerns, and a lack of awareness of the ability to opt out. After the initial testing is complete, the residual dried blood spots (DBS) on newborn screening cards may be used for secondary purposes, including being shared with law enforcement and sold for research. The decreasing costs of whole genome sequencing have also raised concerns that blood spots may be sequenced in the future, limiting any de-identification procedures. While CLIA does specify minimum retention requirements, it does not specify a federal maximum retention period. Retention periods for NBS cards vary by state; for example, New Jersey stores them for 23 years, and Texas may keep them indefinitely. The absence of parental awareness and consent for these activities, and a lack of transparency and federal regulations, has led to significant public concern and apprehension.

New Jersey is this blank void where there's no statute telling the health department that they can keep it, and there's no oversight or limits on what they can do with it. It's limited only to the health department's imagination on how they want to use this blood.

— Brian Morris, Institute for Justice(2023)

The CDC Good laboratory practice guidelines for newborn screening recommend that "laboratory specimen retention procedures should be consistent with patient decisions." Researchers have described the NBS samples as a gold mine representing a patient population that would otherwise be impossible to get. The American Civil Liberties Union (ACLU), Council for Responsible Genetics(CRG), and the International Association of Privacy Professionals(IAPP) oppose the long-term storage of identifiable NBS blood spots.

In 2009, the Texas NBS program had to destroy millions of stored blood spots that had been stored for decades without consent. In Michigan, a 2022 lawsuit found that the NBS program long-term storage and sales to third-parties was found to violate state statues noting how "post-testing conduct is not necessary to effectuate that interest because 'the health of the child is no longer at stake.'" In New Jersey, the Institute for Justice filed a class-action lawsuit in 2022 under the 4th amendment seeking to limit the retention period of NBS cards after they were found to be used in warrantless law enforcement investigations without consent.

== History ==
The origins of CLIA can be traced back to the late 1960s, when cytology laboratories faced issues due to overworked personnel and a high incidence of errors in reading PAP smears. In response to these concerns, the Clinical Laboratory Improvement Amendment was introduced in 1967, which laid down the first set of regulations for laboratory standards, focusing mainly on independent and hospital laboratories.

The Clinical Laboratory Improvement Act of 1988 (CLIA 88) was passed in the US after the publication of an article in November 1987 in The Wall Street Journal entitled "Lax Laboratories: The Pap Test Misses Much Cervical Cancer Through Labs Errors", which alerted the public to the fact that a pap smear may be falsely negative. The article implied that false negative tests were largely due to carelessness among doctors. After this, claims involving pap smears showed an alarming growth. The Act aimed at a comprehensive regulation of gynecologic cytology laboratories.

== CLIA certificates ==
Types of CLIA certificates
Acronym	Certificate	Notes
CoW	Certificate of Waiver	Issued to a laboratory that performs only waived tests.
PPM	Certificate for Provider-performed Microscopy procedures	Issued to a laboratory in which a physician, midlevel practitioner, or dentist performs specific microscopy procedures during the course of a patient's visit. A limited list of provider-performed microscopy procedures is included under this certificate type, which are categorized as moderate complexity testing.
	Certificate of Registration	Issued to a laboratory to allow the laboratory to conduct non-waived (moderate and/or high complexity) testing until the laboratory is surveyed (inspected) to determine its compliance with the CLIA regulations. Only laboratories applying for a certificate of compliance or accreditation will receive a certificate of registration.
CoC	Certificate of Compliance	Issued to a laboratory once the State Agency or CMS surveyors conduct a survey (inspection) and determine that the laboratory is compliant with the applicable CLIA requirements. This type of certificate is issued to a laboratory that performs nonwaived (moderate and/or high complexity) testing.
COA	Certificate of Accreditation	Issued to a laboratory on the basis of the laboratory's accreditation by an accreditation organization approved by CMS. This type of certificate is issued to a laboratory that performs nonwaived (moderate and/or high complexity) testing.

== Accrediting organizations ==
For CLIA laboratories licensed under a Certificate of Accreditation (CoA), bi-annual inspections are conducted by a third-party accreditation organization (AO) that meets or exceeds the CLIA requirements.

Though the Foundation for the Accreditation of Cellular Therapy (FACT) (formerly the Foundation for Accreditation of Hematopoietic Cell Transplantation) does not have deeming status under CLIA, most laboratories involved in cell therapies are accredited by FACT.

In Dec 2022, TJC announced it would no longer recognize the Commission on Office Laboratory Accreditation (COLA) for lab accreditation at TJC hospitals, effective Jan 1, 2023, and facilities would have until Dec 31, 2024, to transition their accreditation. With the COVID-driven inspection backlog and a lack of inspectors, the move was criticized as being purely a financially driven attempt to capture additional market share. No reason for the change was given by CLIA, COLA, or TJC. TJC began recognizing COLA accreditation in 1997.

CLIA Accreditation organizations (AO)
Acronym	Accrediting Organization	Deemed	Notes
AABB	Association for the Advancement of Blood & Biotherapies	1995	formerly American Association of Blood Banks
A2LA	American Association for Laboratory Accreditation	2014	
ACHC	Accreditation Commission for Health Care	1995	Formerly (AOA/AAHHS/HFAP)American Osteopathic Association / Accreditation Association for Hospitals and Health Systems/ Healthcare Facilities Accreditation Program
ASHI	American Society for Histocompatibility and Immunogenetics	1995	
COLA	Commission on Office Laboratory Accreditation	1993	
CAP	College of American Pathologists	1994	
TJC	The Joint Commission	1995	formerly Joint Commission on Accreditation of Healthcare Organizations (JCAHO)

Specialty/Subspecialty by CLIA Accreditation Organizations (AO)
Specialty	Subspeciality	AABB	A2LA	ACHC	ASHI	COLA	CAP	TJC
	Histocompatibility		X	X	X		X	X
Microbiology	Bacteriology	X	X	X		X	X	X
Microbiology	Mycobacteriology		X	X		X	X	X
Microbiology	Mycology		X	X		X	X	X
Microbiology	Parasitology		X	X		X	X	X
Microbiology	Virology	X	X	X		X	X	X
Diagnostic Immunology	Syphilis Serology	X	X	X		X	X	X
Diagnostic Immunology	General Immunology	X	X	X	X	X	X	X
Chemistry	Routine Chemistry	X	X	X		X	X	X
Chemistry	Urinalysis		X	X		X	X	X
Chemistry	Endocrinology		X	X		X	X	X
Chemistry	Toxicology	X	X	X		X	X	X
	Hematology	X	X	X		X	X	X
Immunohaematology	ABO/Rh Group	X	X	X	X	X	X	X
Immunohaematology	Antibody Transfusion	X	X	X		X	X	X
Immunohaematology	Antibody Non-Transfusion	X	X	X		X	X	X
Immunohaematology	Antibody Identification	X	X	X		X	X	X
Immunohaematology	Compatibility Testing	X	X	X		X	X	X
Pathology	Histopathology		X	X		X	X	X
Pathology	Oral Pathology		X	X		X	X	X
Pathology	Cytology		X	X		X	X	X
	Radiobioassay		X	X			X	X
	Cytogenetics		X	X			X	X

=== Validation Surveys ===
FY 2020 CLIA Validation Survey Results
	AABB	A2LA	ACHC	ASHI	CAP	COLA	TJC
Number of Accredited Labs	186	3	127	111	6339	5965	1927
Validation Surveys	1	1	1	1	38	71	10
Surveys with Condition-Level Deficiencies	NA	NA	NA	NA	2	10	4
Surveys with One or More Condition-Level Deficiencies missed by AO	NA	NA	NA	NA	1	8	3
Disparity Rate	NA	NA	NA	NA	2.6%	11.3%	30.0%
*N/A: When a minimum sample size of five is not achieved for an AO, no data is reported, given the lack of statistical significance.

== Laboratory directors ==
Clinical laboratories in the US that perform high complexity testing require a high complexity laboratory director (HCLD) who has earned a doctoral degree in chemical, physical, biological, or clinical laboratory science from an accredited institution and is certified by, and remains certified by, a board approved by HHS. The current approved boards are the following:

Certifying Boards for a high complexity laboratory director (HCLD)
Acronym	Name	Notes
ABB	American Board of Bioanalysis	
ABCC	American Board of Clinical Chemistry	
ABFT	American Board of Forensic Toxicology	(limited to individuals with a doctoral degree with Fellow status)
ABMGG	American Board of Medical Genetics and Genomics	(formerly known as American Board of Medical Genetics (ABMG))
ABMLI	American Board of Medical Laboratory Immunology	no longer accepting new exam applicants
ABMM	American Board of Medical Microbiology	
ACHI	American College of Histocompatibility and Immunogenetics	(formerly known as American Board of Histocompatibility and Immunogenetics (ABHI))
NRCC	National Registry of Certified Chemists	
ASCP	American Society for Clinical Pathology	Diplomate in Medical Laboratory Immunology (DMLI)

== Complaint Handling ==
CLIA complaints tri-fold

Under CLIA, anyone, including patients and their families, laboratory personnel, and the general public, can submit anonymous complaints if there are concerns about the quality of laboratory testing. The most common CLIA complaints are concerns about a laboratory's operations, such as: unlabeled specimens, unqualified staff, record falsification, missing or incorrect test results and the confidentiality of patient information. For laboratories accredited by a laboratory Accreditation Organization (AO), complaints may be referred to the laboratory's AO.

Though anyone may lodge a complaint, relatively few laboratory complaints have been filed.

This may be due to a lack of publicity about complaint filing, since CLIA does not require that laboratory employees or patients be made aware of how to file a complaint, and to privacy concerns stemming from the lack of whistleblower protections. Other limiting factors include an increasing reliance on on-the-job (OTJ)- trained lab personnel who are unaware of regulatory requirements, foreign-sponsored H1b medical technologists fearing retaliatory deportation, and an aging workforce awaiting retirement. Laboratory whistleblowers may face countermeasures such as cover-ups, loss of income, position, or employment, punitive lawsuits, and attacks on their reputation, which would degrade their living conditions and dissuade them from bringing fraud to light.

A June 2006 GAO report found that lab workers may file complaints infrequently due to concerns about retaliation and a lack of understanding of how to do so. The report that CMS requires labs to prominently display complaint posters instructing lab workers how to file anonymous complaints. In a July 2007 response to the GAO, CMS said that it lacked the legal authority to mandate labs to display posters. They plan to take several other steps to increase awareness of complaint processes including: (1) posting fact sheet on the CMS web site on complaint filing (2) adding information on filing complaints to the interpretive guidelines used by surveyors (3) adding complaints received by accrediting organizations to their complaints database and (4) reminding states and accrediting organizations by letter about the importance of complaints. CMS reported that it sent a letter about complaint tracking to accreditation organizations, exempt states, and professional laboratory organizations on November 30, 2007. According to CMS, this letter highlighted the importance of complaint tracking and filing, and encouraged the publication of compliant processes. CMS has also developed a CLIA Brochure on Complaints, which was being prepared for release as of September 2008. Once released, CMS anticipates posting the brochure on its website and printing copies for distribution to laboratories. We will continue to monitor the implementation of this recommendation. In 2009, the GAO recommended that CMS require all survey organizations to develop and require labs to prominently display posters instructing lab workers how to file anonymous complaints. CMS determined that this would not be practical and instead is working on publishing a brochure that will be distributed by surveyors to labs, published on the CMS CLIA Web site, and distributed at lab professional meetings. Few labs were the subject of a complaint each year from 2002 through 2004—significantly less than one complaint per lab per year. Concerns that labs can easily identify the lab workers who file complaints and lab workers' lack of familiarity with how to file a complaint may explain why so few laboratory workers report problems. Complaints are an important tool in detecting quality problems between lab surveys. For example, complaints about testing at a hospital lab were crucial because information had been concealed, complicating the detection of quality problems during the lab's surveys. As a result of a complaint, surveyors were able to substantiate inadequate calibration of testing equipment that could adversely affect patient care.

Several of the AOs, such as CAP, require laboratories to post the complaint contact signs, but only in employee areas.

=== Whistleblower protection ===
Few labs are subject to complaints. For 2024, CLIA budgeted for approximately 209 onsite complaint surveys, representing ~0.06% of the 320,000 CLIA labs. The low volume of lab complaints may be related to complainants' concerns about anonymity and fear of retaliation for filing a complaint. It may be easy for a lab to determine the source of a complaint filed by a lab worker. For example, in some cases, either the nature of the complaint or the piece of testing equipment in question could narrow the list of possible complainants. Because of the difficulty of protecting the anonymity of lab workers who file complaints, whistle-blower protections for such individuals are particularly important. Following congressional testimony by a Maryland hospital lab worker that she and her colleagues feared losing their jobs because of the complaints, a whistleblower protection bill, the "Clinical Laboratory Compliance Improvement Act of 2005", was introduced, but died in committee.

CLIA and federal law provide no specific whistleblower protection to laboratory employees who report CLIA violations. However, CLIA complaints made under the False Claims Act (FCA) may be afforded whistleblower protections. The FCA, which prohibits fraud against government programs, including Medicare and Medicaid, may cover CLIA violations that give rise to FCA violations, such as laboratory deficiencies that render billed services medically worthless. Whether CLIA compliance is a condition of Medicare payment is a contested issue. To qualify for protection under the FCA, the whistleblower must demonstrate that they were engaged in FCA-protected activity and that the employer knew their activity was protected under the FCA, which presents a challenge for whistleblowers who merely report regulatory violations. To be protected under the FCA, they must reasonably believe the regulatory noncompliance has or will amount to fraud against the government, and they must put the employer on notice that their protected activity relates to the filing of false or fraudulent claims. Laboratory workers who merely report CLIA violations without tying the issues to Medicare or Medicaid reimbursement are unlikely to receive FCA whistleblower protection.

From 2004 to 2005, approximately 460 patients Maryland General Hospital were tested for Hepatitis C and HIV with invalid controls. Follow-up retesting was not possible as many patients were unreachable due to being homeless. The incident prompted CAP to add whistleblower protections.

In September 2015, a Theranos employee emailed a complaint to the Centers for Medicare and Medicaid Services (CMS) outlining regulatory noncompliance, which led to the company's exposure as a fraud and subsequent downfall.

External videos
- CBS COVID LAB: State Secrets Exposed

The Valencia Lab fiasco was exposed by whistleblowers, and eventually the lab's contract was quietly cancelled—a testament to the importance of the role of whistleblowers in exposing problems.

— Scott Wilk, California State Senator (2022)

In February 2021, a series of whistleblowers reached out to the CBS Sacramento, alleging improprieties and CLIA violations at the CAP-accredited California Department of Public Health (CPDH) Valencia Branch Laboratory, which had partnered with PerkinElmer under a $1.7 billion no-bid contract. PerkinElmer subsequently sued the whistleblowers for breach of confidentiality. CBS 13 subsequently investigated the Valencia laboratory along with CDPH, which investigated itself and found the allegations substantiated. The laboratory was found to have significant immediate jeopardy deficiencies, but was not sanctioned. The laboratory medical director had previously overseen Theranos. In response, California State Senator Scott Wilk introduced The Whistleblower Protection Act (SB 947) in February 2022, to extend the existing California Whistleblower Protection Act (CWPA) afforded to California state employees to the employees of government contractors that hold state contracts over $5 million. Wilk noted how "brave whistleblowers from the lab risked their livelihoods to expose unlicensed lab techs sleeping on the job, a lack of supervision over untrained staff, contaminated tests, swapped samples, testing errors, a high rate of "inconclusive" results, and inaccurate results, with no process for addressing or rectifying errors" were subsequently "subject to litigation in response to their brave actions to expose the abuse of state funding in the lab, and the potential public health issues stemming from improperly processing and handling COVID 19 specimens." The bill passed unanimously in the California State Senate, but died in the California State Assembly. The CPDH partnership contract with PerkinElmer was terminated on May 15, 2022, and was subsequently criticized for its excess costs, failure to meet expectations, and the state's poor handling of the investigation.

==== False Claims Act ====
In recent years, several successful FCA claims related to CLIA have opened a new avenue of regulatory liability for laboratories and provided a financial incentive for whistleblowers. Historically, laboratory compliance issues have primarily been viewed as billing issues, but increasingly, quality-of-care issues are receiving attention, as whistleblower lawsuits allege substandard or poor-quality testing, which is actionable under the False Claims Act as "worthless service." An improper proficiency testing (PT) referral may result in an FCA claim under the "false certification" theory.

In 2011, a medical technologist filed an FCA claim under the "worthless services" theory against the Mimbres Memorial Hospital in Deming, New Mexico, alleging that routine quality control for microbiology was not performed per CLIA and that the hospital knowingly released and billed for non-verifiable results before the department was shut down. In 2013, the United States District Court for the District of New Mexico dismissed the FCA claim since maintaining compliance with a CLIA Certificate of Compliance (CoC) was not a condition of payment under Medicare, only a condition of participation.

In 2020, an FCA claim against DaVita was filed under the "implied false certification" theory, alleging that specimens from around the country were shipped to Florida, where DaVita maintained its laboratories for tax benefits, under poorly controlled environmental conditions and without validating those storage conditions. The case settled.

In 2021, an oncology clinic in St. Petersburg, Florida, was subject to an FCA claim that resulted in a total judgment of US$1.179 million on 214 fraudulent claims to Medicare that totaled US$755.54 stemming from the lack of a CLIA certificate. The oncology practice had its own CLIA certificate and acquired another oncology clinic with an in-house lab, but did not obtain the clinic's CLIA license, so the existing CLIA certificate did not cover the new practice. Because the lab at the newly acquired oncology practice lacked a proper CLIA certificate, reimbursement was denied. The practice opted to resubmit the bills to fraudulently claim the tests were performed at an office with a valid CLIA certificate. In doing so 214 times, the federal government suffered $755.54 in damages. The court trebled the damages to $2,266.62 and imposed the minimum statutory penalty of $5,500 per violation for each of the 214 violations. The Eleventh circuit noted that "[s]eeing a judgment of $1.179 million based on $755.54 in actual damages may raise an eyebrow," noting that "[f]raud harms the United States in ways untethered to the value of any ultimate payment" and that "[i]n the context of the FCA, we also consider the deterrent effect of a monetary award."

== Litigation ==
CLIA itself has not been the subject of much litigation. Federal district courts have held that the CLIA did not create a private cause of action for individuals to sue laboratories that do not comply with its provisions.

== Budget ==
For the 2026 fiscal year, CLIA was budgeted US$25.2 million. The approximately 86 surveyors conduct 120 surveys annually, 112 initial/recertification and eight follow-up surveys, spending an average of up to 14 hours per survey. The staffing ratio is one clerk per three surveyors, one professional support staff per six surveyors, and one supervisory surveyor per seven surveyors. The projected workload is 7,933 compliance initial and recertification surveys, 2505 follow-up/revisit surveys of compliance laboratories, 393 validations of accredited laboratories, 92 follow-up/revisit surveys of accredited laboratories, 215 complaint surveys, and 725 proficiency testing desk reviews. The Waived Laboratory Survey Initiative is discontinued, and CLIA waivers are no longer available; PPM laboratories will not receive routine inspections.

== CLIA identification number ==
CLIA identification numbers are 10-digit alphanumeric unique identifiers issued by the CLIA data system to identify a CLIA laboratory. This is assigned at the time of initial entry of the CLIA application and included with the mailing of the remittance fee coupon.

10-digit alphanumeric CLIA identifier
Positions	Field description
1 and 2	Identify the State in which the laboratory was located when it initially applied for a CLIA certificate.: CLIA State ID / State; 01 / Alabama; 02 / Alaska; 64 / American Samoa; 03 / Arizona; 04 / Arkansas; 05 / California; 06 / Colorado; 07 / Connecticut; 08 / Delaware; 09 / District Of Columbia; 10 / Florida; 11 / Georgia; 65 / Guam; 12 / Hawaii; 13 / Idaho; 14 / Illinois; 15 / Indiana; 16 / Iowa; 17 / Kansas; 18 / Kentucky; 19 / Louisiana; 20 / Maine; 21 / Maryland; 22 / Massachusetts; 23 / Michigan; 24 / Minnesota; 25 / Mississippi; 26 / Missouri; 27 / Montana; 28 / Nebraska; 29 / Nevada; 30 / New Hampshire; 31 / New Jersey; 32 / New Mexico; 34 / New York; 35 / North Carolina; 36 / North Dakota; 37 / Ohio; 38 / Oklahoma; 39 / Oregon; 40 / Pennsylvania; 40 / Puerto Rico; 41 / Rhode Island; 66 / Saipan; 42 / South Carolina; 43 / South Dakota; 44 / Tennessee; 45 / Texas; 46 / Utah; 47 / Vermont; 49 / Virginia; 48 / Virgin Islands; 50 / Washington; 51 / West Virginia; 52 / Wisconsin; 53 / Wyoming
3	A capital letter "D" to identify the provider/supplier as a laboratory certified under CLIA.
4 to 10	The unique facility number identifiers.

An example CLIA ID number is 21D0665373, the CLIA Certificate of Accreditation (CoA) for the National Institutes of Health (NIH) Department of Laboratory Medicine (DLM) located in Bethesda, Maryland.

Laboratories that are CLIA-exempt and those designated as VA laboratories do not have a CLIA certificate, but are assigned a CLIA identification number. Once a laboratory is assigned a number, it retains this number even if it withdraws from CLIA, has its certificate revoked, changes its certificate type or ownership, location (i.e., relocates to another State), name, or operator. A CLIA number will not be reassigned to another laboratory. Although CLIA-exempt laboratories do not need a CLIA certificate to operate, they are assigned a CLIA identification number for Medicare and Medicaid payment purposes.

== See also ==
- Medical laboratory scientist
- Individualized Quality Control Plan
