= ISO 15189 =

ISO standard

ISO 15189 Medical laboratories — Requirements for quality and competence is an international standard that specifies the quality management system requirements particular to medical laboratories. The standard was developed by the International Organization for Standardization's Technical Committee 212 (ISO/TC 212). ISO/TC 212 assigned ISO 15189 to a working group to prepare the standard based on the details of ISO/IEC 17025:1999 General requirements for the competence of testing and calibration laboratories. This working group included provision of advice to medical laboratory users, including specifics on the collection of patient samples, the interpretation of test results, acceptable turnaround times, how testing is to be provided in a medical emergency, and the lab's role in the education and training of health care staff. While the standard is based on ISO/IEC 17025 and ISO 9001, it is a unique document that takes into consideration the specific requirements of the medical environment and the importance of the medical laboratory to patient care.

== History ==
The first version of the standard was published in 2003, and it was revised in 2007 to align more closely to ISO/IEC 17025. A third edition of the standard was published in 2012, which revised the layout again and added a section on laboratory information management.

Starting in 2010, it took four years for the Kenya National HIV Reference Laboratory to gain ISO 15189 accreditation.

In 2015 Plebani et al pointed out that "despite its growing global recognition by the main scientific organizations in the field of laboratory medicine, in many countries only a small number of laboratories are currently accredited" to ISO 15189.

In 2019 the question was asked "How Does ISO 15189 Laboratory Accreditation Support the Delivery of Healthcare in Ethiopia?" and answered by a systematic review.

In 2021 it became apparent that the International Health Regulations was a driver for ISO 15189 accreditation when the UKHSA provided training to EPHI staff.

In 2022 the 4th edition of ISO 15189 was published.

== See also ==
- Quality management system
- List of ISO standards
