= National Registry of Certified Chemists =

American certification agency for chemistry professionals

The National Registry of Certified Chemists (NRCC) is an American certification agency for chemistry professionals founded in 1967.

In 1999, the organization name changed from National Registry in Clinical Chemistry to National Registry of Certified Chemists to reflect the broader scope of chemists.

== Certifications ==
National Registry of Certified Chemists (NRCC) Certifications
Name	Designation	Year Started	Notes
Cannabis Chemist			
Chemical Hygiene Officer	NRCC-CHO	1997	
Clinical Chemist	NRCC-CC		
Clinical Chemistry Technologist			
Environmental Analytical Chemist	NRCC-EAC		
Industrial Hygiene Chemist	NRCC-IH	2020	Joint program with American Industrial Hygiene Association
Toxicological Chemist		1987	
Toxicological Technologist		2012	
