= Fertility Clinic Success Rate and Certification Act =

The Fertility Clinic Success Rate and Certification Act (FCSRCA) of 1992 are United States regulatory requirements that mandate all assisted reproductive technology (ART) clinics report pregnancy success rates data to the Centers for Disease Control and Prevention (CDC) in a standardized manner and for the CDC to publish pregnancy success rates .

FCSRCA is the primary consumer protection regulation for in-vitro fertilization in the US. Though participation in FCSRCA is mandatory, there is no penalty for non-participation. In 2024, approximately 90% of fertility clinics participated, though the results are susceptible to manipulation by cherry picking couples with a higher chance of conception. The CDC annually audits a sampling of participating clinics for validity.

== Criticism ==
The FCSRCA has been criticized for its lack of enforceability and as being insufficient. Currently, the fertility industry in the United States is largely self-regulated with voluntary guidelines established by American Society for Reproductive Medicine (ASRM).

FCSRCA also does not collect embryo data, including how many embryos are created with each IVF cycle, nor how many are discarded, frozen, or implanted.
