= Laboratory-developed test =

Laboratory-developed tests (LDTs) are a class of in vitro diagnostics (IVDs) designed, manufactured, and used within a single laboratory. They are employed for various medical diagnoses and research applications, offering advantages in flexibility and fostering innovation in the diagnostics field.

"Laboratory-developed test" is a term used to refer to a certain class of in vitro diagnostics (IVDs) that, in the U.S., were traditionally regulated under the Clinical Laboratory Improvement Amendments program.

== United States ==
In the United States, the Food and Drug Administration (FDA) has determined that while such tests qualify as medical devices, these products could enter the market without prior approval from the agency. In 2014, the FDA announced that it would start regulating some LDTs. In general, however, it has not done so, as of April 2019.

As LDTs do not require FDA 510(k) clearance required by other diagnostic tests, they have been viewed as a regulatory loophole by opponents.

=== Direct-to-consumer ===
Direct-to-consumer tests are regulated as medical devices, although they are not necessarily reviewed by the FDA.

23andMe direct-to-consumer genetic tests were originally offered as LDTs, but the FDA challenged that and forced the company to submit the test for approval as a class II medical device.

== Companies ==
Several companies offer lab-developed tests.

Several companies are developing laboratory-developed tests, including Adaptive Biotechnologies Corporation, Quest Diagnostics, Roche, and Illumina.

== Market overview ==
The global market for laboratory-developed testing (LDT) is experiencing significant growth, with a projected value of US$ 4582.6 million by 2030 from US$ 3518.7 million in 2023 (CAGR of 3.8%). This growth is driven by advancements in genetic testing, the increasing demand for personalized medicine, and the ongoing expansion of the healthcare and diagnostics sectors.
