= MTA =

MTA may refer to:

== Organizations ==
=== Transportation ===
- Metropolitan Transportation Authority, the public transport agency in the metropolitan area of New York City, United States
- Metropolitan Transit Authority (disambiguation), which may refer to several public transport/transit agencies
- Flint Mass Transportation Authority, Genesee County, Michigan
- Maine Turnpike Authority, Maine
- Manchester Transit Authority, New Hampshire
- Maryland Transit Administration
- Massachusetts Bay Transportation Authority, formerly Metropolitan Transit Authority
- Massachusetts Turnpike Authority
- Mendocino Transit Authority, California
- Mountain Ash railway station, Wales, National Rail station code
- Nashville Metropolitan Transit Authority, doing business as WeGo Public Transit, Tennessee
- San Francisco Municipal Transportation Agency, California
- Los Angeles County Metropolitan Transportation Authority
- Mersin-Tarsus-Adana Railway, a defunct Ottoman railway company
- Master Top Airlines, a defunct Brazilian airline company

=== Education ===
- Hungarian Academy of Sciences (Magyar Tudományos Akadémia), Budapest, Hungary
- Marsha Stern Talmudical Academy, an Orthodox Jewish private high school in New York, New York, US
- Mount Allison University, a university in Sackville, New Brunswick, Canada
- Musical Theatre Academy, a drama college based in London, UK

=== Other ===
- Metrolina Theatre Association, an organization which advocates performing arts in Charlotte, North Carolina, US
- MTA Records, More Than Alot Records, a record label
- MTA International, Muslim Television Ahmadiyya International, a satellite television network
- Move to Amend, a U.S. political advocacy organization that seeks to amend the Constitution
- Manufacturing Technologies Association, a UK trade association
- Market Technicians Association, a non-profit organization of technical analysts
- General Directorate of Mineral Research and Exploration (Turkey), known as MTA
- Michigan Townships Association, an association of US township governments
- Mong Tai Army, an armed rebel group
- Metro Transit Assassins, a graffiti collective

== Sports ==
- Maccabi Tel Aviv, a sports club in Israel
  - Maccabi Tel Aviv B.C., basketball team
  - Maccabi Tel Aviv F.C., football (soccer) team
- Maximum time aloft, a sporting event with a boomerang

== Science and technology ==
- methylthioadenosine, a cofactor in biochemistry
- 4-Methylthioamphetamine, a designer drug of the substituted amphetamine class developed in the 1990s
- Material transfer agreement, governing the transfer of research materials between two organizations
- Mineral trioxide aggregate, dental material, used in endodontics and vital pulp therapy
- MTA (Swedish: Mobiltelefonisystem A), a former manual mobile network in Sweden
- Medial temporal lobe type of brain atrophy.
- Mousterian of Acheulean tradition _{(fr)}, a cultural and technological facies of the Mousterian

=== Computing ===
- Cray MTA-2, a supercomputer based on the design of the never-built Tera MTA
- Message transfer agent or mail transfer agent, software that transfers e-mail between computers
- Multi-touch attribution is a form of attribution (marketing)
- Multimedia terminal adapter, a combination cable modem and telephone adapter
- Multi-Threaded Apartment, a concept used in Microsoft's Component Object Model programming architecture
- Microsoft Technology Associate, a certification scheme run by Microsoft

== Gaming ==
- Multi Theft Auto, a mod for computer games in the PC game series Grand Theft Auto

== Other uses ==
- "M.T.A." (song), or "Charlie on the M.T.A.", a 1959 hit song by The Kingston Trio
- Major trading area, a geographic region of the US surrounding a major city; See List of Basic Trading Areas
- Mall Taman Anggrek, a shopping center in West Jakarta, Indonesia
- Mid-term adjustment, a change in an insurance policy
- Military Technical Agreement, treaty ending the Kosovo War in June 1999
- Milk Tea Alliance, an online democracy and human rights movement
- Farmall M-TA, a widely used model in the Farmall M tractor series
- UAC/HAL Il-214 Multirole Transport Aircraft, a planned medium-lift military transport

== See also ==
- Metastasis-associated protein:
  - MTA1
  - MTA2
  - MTA3
