= BTA =

BTA may refer to:

- Butyric acid
- Baltimore Transit Alliance
- Bangsamoro Transition Authority, interim region government in the Philippines
- Basic Trading Area, a geographical area defined by the U.S. Federal Communications Commission
- Becoming the Archetype, a Christian metal band
- Benzotriazole
- Bicycle Transportation Alliance
- Bilateral trade agreement
- Bilateral Terran Alliance, a fictional human alliance in the 1985 film Enemy Mine
- Biological Terrain Assessment
- Black Theatre Alliance, a federation of theater companies in New York City
- BlueTooth Address
- Bolshoi Teleskop Azimutalnyi, a 6 m telescope located in Russia
- Botswana Telecommunications Authority
- British Tourist Authority
- British Triathlon Association, the former name of the British Triathlon Federation
- BTA Bank, of Kazakhstan, formerly Bank TuranAlem
- Bulgarian News Agency
- Business Technology Association
- Business Transformation Agency
- Board of Tax Appeals
- Blair Municipal Airport, Blair, Nebraska (FAA LID code)
- Bertoua Airport, Bertoua, Cameroon (IATA code)
