= Ranally city rating system =

Classification of U.S. cities

The Ranally city rating system is a tool developed by Rand McNally & Co. to classify U.S. cities based on their general economic and business importance. The system is designed to reflect an underlying hierarchy whereby consumers and businesses go to a city of a certain size for a certain function; some functions are widely available and others are only available in the largest cities.

The system was developed for Rand McNally by geographer Richard L. Forstall and released in 1964. The city ratings were updated periodically in the now discontinued Rand McNally Commercial Atlas and Marketing Guide, an annual two-volume set, which is available in many libraries. Among the criteria for categorization are retail sales, wholesaling, banking activity, newspaper circulation, and the presence of universities, hospitals and corporate headquarters. The size of the city's tributary area is critical to determining whether it will be rated 1, 2, 3, or 4. As of 2006, there are 1,492 cities rated.

The system consists of a number and a letter. The number reflects a city's importance in the national hierarchy. Nationally important business centers are ranked 1. Regional business centers are ranked 2. Significant local business centers are ranked 3 and business centers whose importance is purely local are ranked 4. The letter reflects its importance in its own trading area. Doubled letters serve to distinguish centers within a class. Cities that serve a wide surrounding market area (trading area) are called basic trading centers. The most important such center in a trading area is rated A. Other basic trading centers in the same trading area are rated B. Cities that mostly serve their own population and that of neighboring communities don't constitute basic trading centers; these are rated C. Suburbs are rated S. For example, Dallas is rated 1-AA (a major national business center, and the primary trading center in its own market), Fort Worth is rated 2-BB (a major regional business center, and a secondary trading center), and Arlington is rated 2-S (a regional business center classified as a suburb). Corsicana, located in the same market, is rated 4-C (a local business center serving only a small part of the trading area).

Rand McNally divides the country into basic trading areas (487 as of 2008), of which all except one has exactly one A-rated city (the Hyannis, MA trading area lacks any rated cities). The basic trading areas are aggregated into major trading areas, of which there are 47. The Federal Communications Commission uses these areas for determining wireless territory boundaries.

New York City has always been given the unique rating 1-AAAA due to its preeminent status in the national hierarchy. Chicago was originally the only other city rated 1-AAA as having influence over a large area of the country. In 1988, Los Angeles was similarly given a 1-AAA rating. Thirteen cities are given the rating 1-AA as major national business centers: Atlanta, Boston, Cleveland, Dallas, Detroit, Houston, Miami, Minneapolis, Philadelphia, Pittsburgh, St. Louis, San Francisco, and Washington, D.C.

Ranally city rating	Description	Examples (* indicates a complete listing)
1-AAAA	Unique rating for New York	New York City*
1-AAA	Unique rating for Chicago and Los Angeles	Chicago, Los Angeles*
1-AA	Major national business centers	Atlanta, Boston, Cleveland, Dallas, Detroit, Houston, Miami, Minneapolis, Philadelphia, Pittsburgh, St. Louis, San Francisco, and Washington, D.C. (13 cities)*
1-A	Other national business centers	Baltimore, Cincinnati, Columbus, Denver, Indianapolis, Kansas City, Milwaukee, New Orleans, Oklahoma City, Phoenix, Portland, San Antonio, San Diego, and Seattle (14 cities)*
2-AA	Major regional business centers	Albany, Albuquerque, Allentown, Austin, Baton Rouge, Birmingham, Buffalo, Charlotte, Columbia, Dayton, Des Moines, El Paso, Grand Rapids, Harrisburg, Hartford, Honolulu, Jackson, Jacksonville, Knoxville, Las Vegas, Lexington, Little Rock, Louisville, Madison, Memphis, Nashville, New Haven, Norfolk, Omaha, Orlando, Peoria, Providence, Raleigh, Richmond, Rochester, NY, Sacramento, Salt Lake City, Shreveport, Spokane, Springfield, MA, Syracuse, Tampa, Toledo, Tucson, Tulsa, West Palm Beach, Wichita, and Youngstown (48 cities)*
2-BB	Secondary major regional business centers	Akron, Fort Lauderdale, Fort Worth, Oakland, St. Paul, St. Petersburg, San Jose, Wilmington, DE (8 cities)*
2-CC	Same as 2-BB, but not constituting a basic trading center	Newark*
2-A	Other regional business centers	Amarillo, Anchorage, Augusta, GA, Bakersfield, Beaumont, Canton, Charleston, SC, Charleston, WV, Chattanooga, Colorado Springs, Corpus Christi, Davenport, Daytona Beach, Erie, Eugene, Evansville, Fayetteville, NC, Flint, Fort Myers, Fort Wayne, Fresno, Green Bay, Greensboro, Greenville, SC, Huntington, WV, Kalamazoo, Lafayette, LA, Lancaster, PA, Lansing, Lubbock, McAllen, Melbourne, Mobile, Modesto, Montgomery, Pensacola, Portland, ME, Reading, Reno, Roanoke, Rockford, Saginaw, Salem, OR, Sarasota, Savannah, Scranton, South Bend, Springfield, IL, Springfield, MO, Stockton, Worcester (51 cities)*
2-B	Secondary regional business centers	Clearwater, Newport News, Tacoma, Trenton, Virginia Beach, and Winston-Salem (6 cities)*
2-C	Same as 2-B, but not constituting a basic trading center	Ann Arbor, Bridgeport, Riverside, and San Bernardino (4 cities)*
2-S	Suburbs analogous to 2-C cities	Anaheim, Arlington, Costa Mesa, Dearborn, Hialeah, Hollywood, FL, Long Beach (the largest city classified by Rand McNally as a suburb), Mesa, Paramus, Pasadena, Santa Ana, Southfield, MI, Stamford, Torrance, Troy, MI, White Plains (16 suburbs)*
3-AA	Major significant local business centers	Abilene, TX, Albany, GA, Alexandria, LA, Altoona, PA, Appleton, WI, Asheville, NC, Atlantic City, NJ, Bangor, ME, Billings, MT, Biloxi, MS, Binghamton, NY, Bloomington, IL, Boise, ID, Brownsville, TX, Burlington, VT, Cedar Rapids, IA, Champaign, IL, Charlottesville, VA, Columbus, GA, Decatur, IL, Duluth, MN, Eau Claire, WI, Elmira, NY, Fargo, ND, Florence, AL, Fort Smith, AR, Gainesville, FL, Huntsville, AL, Jackson, MI, Johnstown, PA, Kingsport, TN, La Crosse, WI, Lafayette, IN, Lake Charles, LA, Lakeland, FL, Laredo, TX, Lawton, OK, Lima, OH, Lincoln, NE, Longview, TX, Lynchburg, VA, Macon, GA, Manchester, NH, Mansfield, OH, Medford, OR, Midland, TX, Monroe, LA, Muncie, IN, Muskegon, MI, New London, CT, Ocala, FL, Odessa, TX, Parkersburg, WV, Poughkeepsie, NY, Provo, UT, Pueblo, CO, Rochester, MN, St. Joseph, MO, Salinas, CA, San Angelo, TX, Santa Barbara, CA, Sioux City, IA, Sioux Falls, SD, Tallahassee, FL, Terre Haute, IN, Texarkana, TX, Topeka, KS, Tuscaloosa, AL, Tyler, TX, Utica, NY, Visalia, CA, Waco, TX, Waterloo, IA, Wheeling, WV, Wichita Falls, TX, Wilmington, NC, Yakima, WA, and York, PA (78 cities)*
3-BB	Secondary major significant local business centers	Durham, NC, Fall River, MA, Gastonia, NC, Hampton, VA, New Bedford, MA, Niagara Falls, NY, Monterey, CA, Ogden, UT, Pawtucket, RI, Schenectady, NY, Spartanburg, SC, Springfield, OH, Waterbury, CT, and Wilkes-Barre, PA (14 cities)*
3-CC	Same as 3-BB, but not constituting a basic trading center	Boulder, CO, Everett, WA, Oxnard, CA, Racine, WI, Santa Rosa, CA, Ventura, CA, and Warwick, RI (7 cities)*
3-SS	Suburbs analogous to 3-CC cities	Alexandria, VA, Arlington, VA, Aurora, CO, Aurora, IL, Bellevue, WA, Beverly Hills, CA, Bloomington, MN, Brockton, MA, Burlington, MA, Cambridge, MA, Cherry Hill, NJ, Concord, CA, Danbury, CT, Edina, MN, El Cajon, CA, Fairfax, VA, Framingham, MA, Fremont, CA, Fullerton, CA, Glendale, CA, Greensburg, PA, Hackensack, NJ, Hayward, CA, Huntington Beach, CA, Jersey City, NJ, Joliet, IL, Kansas City, KS, Lakewood, CO, Lawrence, MA, Livonia, MI, Lowell, MA, Mountain View, CA, Newport Beach, CA, Newton, MA, Norwalk, CT, Orange, CA, Overland Park, KS, Palo Alto, CA, Pomona, CA, Pontiac, MI, Rockville, MD, San Leandro, CA, San Mateo, CA, Schaumburg, IL, Scottsdale, AZ, Santa Monica, CA, Skokie, IL, Sterling Heights, MI, Vancouver, WA, Walnut Creek, CA, Warren, MI, Waukegan, IL, Wayne, NJ, Woodbridge, NJ, and Yonkers, NY (55 suburbs)*
3-A	Other significant local business centers	Aberdeen, SD, Adrian, MI, Anderson, IN, Anderson, SC, Anniston, AL, Ardmore, OK, Ashtabula, OH, Athens, GA, Bartlesville, OK, Battle Creek, MI, Beckley, WV, Bellingham, WA, Bend, OR, Benton Harbor, MI, Big Spring, TX, Bismarck, ND, Bloomington, IN, Bluefield, WV, Bowling Green, KY, Bozeman, MT, Bremerton, WA, Brunswick, GA, Bryan, TX, Burlington, IA, Burlington, NC, Butte, MT, Cape Girardeau, MO, Carbondale, IL, Casper, WY, Cheyenne, WY, Chico, CA, Chillicothe, OH, Clarksburg, WV, Clarksville, TN, Cleveland, TN, Clinton, IA, Columbia, MO, Columbus, IN, Columbus, MS, Cookeville, TN, Cumberland, MD, Dalton, GA, Danville, IL, Danville, VA, Decatur, AL, Dothan, AL, Dover, DE, Dubuque, IA, El Centro, CA, Elkhart, IN, Enid, OK, Eureka, CA, Fairbanks, AK, Fairmont, WV, Farmington, NM, Fayetteville, AR, Findlay, OH, Flagstaff, AZ, Florence, SC, Fond du Lac, WI, Fort Collins, CO, Fort Dodge, IA, Fort Pierce, FL, Fort Walton Beach, FL, Fredericksburg, VA, Gadsden, AL, Gainesville, GA, Galesburg, IL, Gallup, NM, Glens Falls, NY, Goldsboro, NC, Grand Forks, ND, Grand Island, NE, Grand Junction, CO, Great Bend, KS, Great Falls, MT, Greeley, CO, Greenville, MS, Greenville, NC, Greenwood, SC, Hagerstown, MD, Hammond, LA, Harrisonburg, VA, Hastings, NE, Hattiesburg, MS, Helena, MT, Hickory, NC, Hilo, HI, Hot Springs, AR, Houma, LA, Hutchinson, KS, Idaho Falls, ID, Indiana, PA, Iowa City, IA, Ithaca, NY, Jackson, TN, Jacksonville, IL, Jacksonville, NC, Jamestown, NY, Janesville, WI, Jefferson City, MO, Jonesboro, AR, Joplin, MO, Kankakee, IL, Kennewick, WA, Klamath Falls, OR, Kokomo, IN, La Salle, IL, Las Cruces, NM, Laurel, MS, Lawrence, KS, Lebanon, NH, Lewiston, ID, Lewiston, ME, Longview, WA, Lufkin, TX, Manhattan, KS, Manitowoc, WI, Mankato, MN, Marinette, WI, Marion, IN, Marion, OH, Martinsville, VA, Mason City, IA, Meadville, PA, Merced, CA, Meridian, MS, Michigan City, IN, Minot, ND, Missoula, MT, Morgantown, WV, Mount Vernon, IL, Muskogee, OK, Myrtle Beach, SC, Naples, FL, Natchez, MS, New Bern, NC, New Castle, PA, Norfolk, NE, North Platte, NE, Olean, NY, Olympia, WA, Opelika, AL, Orangeburg, SC, Owensboro, KY, Paducah, KY, Panama City, FL, Paris, TX, Pine Bluff, AR, Pittsfield, MA, Plattsburgh, NY, Pocatello, ID, Poplar Bluff, MO, Portsmouth, OH, Pottsville, PA, Quincy, IL, Rapid City, SD, Redding, CA, Richmond, IN, Rocky Mount, NC, Rome, GA, Roseburg, OR, Roswell, NM, Rutland, VT, St. Cloud, MN, Salina, KS, Salisbury, MD, Sandusky, OH, San Luis Obispo, CA, Santa Fe, NM, Scottsbluff, NE, Sharon, PA, Sheboygan, WI, Sherman, TX, State College, PA, Staunton, VA, Steubenville, OH, Stevens Point, WI, Stroudsburg, PA, Sumter, SC, Temple, TX, Traverse City, MI, Tupelo, MS, Twin Falls, ID, Valdosta, GA, Vicksburg, MS, Victoria, TX, Vincennes, IN, Walla Walla, WA, Watertown, NY, Waterville, ME, Wausau, WI, Waycross, GA, Wenatchee, WA, Williamsport, PA, Willmar, MN, Winchester, VA, Yuba City, CA, Yuma, AZ, Zanesville, OH (200 cities)*
3-B	Secondary significant local business centers	Albany, OR, Ashland, KY, Auburn, AL, Augusta, ME, Bay City, MI, Beloit, WI, Bethlehem, PA, Boca Raton, FL, Bradenton, FL, Bristol, TN, Bristol, VA, Centralia, WA, Chambersburg, PA, College Station, TX, Concord, NH, Corvallis, OR, Easton, PA, Fitchburg, MA, Grants Pass, OR, Gulfport, MS, Hanover, PA, Harlingen, TX, Hazleton, PA, Hendersonville, NC, High Point, NC, Holyoke, MA, Johnson City, TN, Killeen, TX, Kingston, NY, Kinston, NC, Leominster, MA, Marshfield, WI, Marysville, CA, Meriden, CT, Mishawaka, IN, Moline, IL, Nampa, ID, Nashua, NH, New Iberia, LA, New Philadelphia, OH, Orem, UT, Oshkosh, WI, Pascagoula, MS, Pasco, WA, Peru, IL, Petersburg, VA, Port Arthur, TX, Richland, WA, Rome, NY, Santa Maria, CA, Springfield, OR, Sterling, IL, Stuart, FL, Vero Beach, FL, Warren, OH, Wilson, NC, Winter Haven, FL, Wisconsin Rapids, WI (58 cities)*
3-C	Same as 3-B, but not constituting a basic trading center	Ames, IA, Annapolis, MD, Asheboro, NC, Auburn, NY, Butler, PA, Carlisle, PA, Chapel Hill, NC, Dover, OH, Fairfield, CA, Frederick, MD, Galveston, TX, Geneva, NY, Hamilton, OH, Holland, MI, Indio, CA, Lancaster, CA, Lancaster, OH, Lebanon, PA, Lockport, NY, Middletown, NY, Middletown, OH, Midland, MI, Monroe, MI, Morristown, TN, Murfreesboro, TN, Newark, OH, New Britain, CT, Newburgh, NY, Newport, RI, Oak Ridge, TN, Palm Springs, CA, Port Huron, MI, Portsmouth, NH, Portsmouth, VA, Rock Hill, SC, Rock Island, IL, Salisbury, NC, Santa Cruz, CA, Shawnee, OK, Texas City, TX, Troy, NY, Uniontown, PA, Vineland, NJ, Washington, PA, Wooster, OH (51 cities)
3-S	Suburbs analogous to 3-C cities	Alameda, CA, Arlington Heights, IL, Baytown, TX, Beaverton, OR, Belleville, IL, Berkeley, CA, Bossier City, LA, Burbank, CA, Camden, NJ, Chesapeake, VA, Chula Vista, CA, Clayton, MO, Coral Gables, FL, Council Bluffs, IA, Des Plaines, IL, Edison, NJ, Elgin, IL, Elizabeth, NJ, Elyria, OH, Euclid, OH, Evanston, IL, Gaithersburg, MD, Garden Grove, CA, Garland, TX, Glendale, AZ, Greenwich, CT, Hammond, IN, Independence, MO, Irving, TX, Lorain, OH, Lynn, MA, Manchester, CT, Marietta, GA, Melrose Park, IL, Miami Beach, FL, Midwest City, OK, National City, CA, New Brunswick, NJ, New Rochelle, NY, Norman, OK, Norristown, PA, North Charleston, SC, North Little Rock, AR, Parma, OH, Pasadena, TX, Paterson, NJ, Peekskill, NY, Pekin, IL, Plano, TX, Pompano Beach, FL, Quincy, MA, Redlands, CA, Redwood City, CA, Renton, WA, Royal Oak, MI, Salem, MA, San Rafael, CA, Santa Clara, CA, Simi Valley, CA, Smyrna, GA, Somerville, MA, Sunnyvale, CA, Tempe, AZ, Waltham, MA, Waukesha, WI, West Allis, WI, West Hartford, CT, West Valley City, UT, Woonsocket, RI, Wyoming, MI (180 suburbs)
4-A	Other local business centers	Aberdeen, WA, Ada, OK, Alpena, MI, Athens, OH, Bemidji, MN, Blytheville, AR, Brainerd, MN, Brownwood, TX, Carlsbad, NM, Clovis, NM, Coffeyville, KS, Coos Bay, OR, Corbin, KY, Dickinson, ND, Dodge City, KS, DuBois, PA, Dyersburg, TN, Eagle Pass, TX, East Liverpool, OH, El Dorado, AR, Emporia, KS, Escanaba, MI, Fergus Falls, MN, Garden City, KS, Harrison, AR, Hays, KS, Hobbs, NM, Houghton, MI, Huron, SD, Iron Mountain, MI, Ironwood, MI, Juneau, AK, Kahului, HI, Kalispell, MT, Keene, NH, Kirksville, MO, LaGrange, GA, Liberal, KS, Lihue, HI, Logan, UT, Logan, WV, Madisonville, KY, Marquette, MI, Marshalltown, IA, Mattoon, IL, McAlester, OK, McComb, MS, McCook, NE, Middlesboro, KY, Mitchell, SD, Mount Pleasant, MI, Nogales, AZ, Oil City, PA, Oneonta, NY, Ottumwa, IA, Petoskey, MI, Pittsburg, KS, Ponca City, OK, Port Angeles, WA, Prescott, AZ, Presque Isle, ME, Riverton, WY, Roanoke Rapids, NC, Rock Springs, WY, Rolla, MO, Russellville, AR, St. George, UT, Sault Ste. Marie, MI, Sedalia, MO, Selma, AL, Sierra Vista, AZ, Somerset, KY, Stillwater, OK, Sunbury, PA, Watertown, SD, West Plains, MO, Williamson, WV, Williston, ND, Worthington, MN (79 cities)*
4-B	Secondary local business centers	Albert Lea, MN, Auburn, ME, Austin, MN, Bedford, IN, Bennington, VT, Bradford, PA, Brookhaven, MS, Brunswick, ME, Calexico, CA, Cambridge, OH, Camden, AR, Cedar Falls, IA, Centralia, IL, Claremont, NH, Clearfield, PA, Corinth, MS, Corning, NY, Del Rio, TX, Denison, TX, Douglas, AZ, Duncan, OK, Dunkirk, NY, Durango, CO, Effingham, IL, Elkins, WV, Enterprise, AL, Fairmont, MN, Franklin, PA, Gillette, WY, Glasgow, KY, Greenwood, MS, Hanford, CA, Hannibal, MO, Harlan, KY, Hopkinsville, KY, Hornell, NY, Junction City, KS, Kearney, NE, Ketchikan, AK, Lahaina, HI, La Porte, IN, Lenoir, NC, Logansport, IN, Loveland, CO, Lumberton, NC, Magnolia, AR, Marietta, OH, Marion, IL, Marshall, MN, Marshall, TX, Martinsburg, WV, Mayfield, KY, Menominee, MI, Miami, OK, Morganton, NC, Moscow, ID, Murray, KY, Nacogdoches, TX, North Bend, OR, Norwich, CT, Oroville, CA, Ottawa, IL, Paragould, AR, Parsons, KS, Pendleton, OR, Pikeville, KY, Porterville, CA, Rhinelander, WI, Rogers, AR, Salem, OH, Shamokin, PA, Sikeston, MO, Springdale, AR, Starkville, MS, Streator, IL, Texarkana, AR, Thibodaux, LA, Tiffin, OH, Tifton, GA, Titusville, FL, Union City, TN, Urbana, IL, Wailuku, HI, Warner Robins, GA, Warren, PA, Washington, IN, Washington, NC, Waynesboro, VA, Weirton, WV, Winona, MN (90 cities)*
4-C	Same as 4-B, but not constituting a basic trading center	Alamogordo, NM, Alliance, OH, Batavia, NY, Beatrice, NE, Beaver Dam, WI, Bellefontaine, OH, Borger, TX, Cadillac, MI, Canton, IL, Carson City, NV, Clarksdale, MS, Coeur d'Alene, ID, Columbia, TN, Columbus, NE, Conway, AR, Corsicana, TX, Cortland, NY, Cullman, AL, DeKalb, IL, Dover, NH, Dublin, GA, Dunn, NC, Elizabeth City, NC, Elizabethtown, KY, Frankfort, KY, Grand Haven, MI, Greenfield, MA, Greenville, OH, Griffin, GA, Havre, MT, Henderson, NC, Hibbing, MN, Jamestown, ND, Kerrville, TX, Key West, FL, Kissimmee, FL, Laramie, WY, Leavenworth, KS, Lebanon, TN, Lewistown, PA, Lock Haven, PA, Lodi, CA, Lompoc, CA, Longmont, CO, Macomb, IL, Madison, IN, Maysville, KY, Moberly, MO, Morgan City, LA, Moultrie, GA, Mount Vernon, OH, Muscatine, IA, New Castle, IN, New Ulm, MN, Oswego, NY, Owatonna, MN, Palatka, FL, Palestine, TX, Pampa, TX, Plainview, TX, Richmond, KY, Rochester, NH, Rockingham, NC, Ruston, LA, St. Augustine, FL, Searcy, AR, Shelby, NC, Sterling, CO, Superior, WI, Taunton, MA, Torrington, CT, Ukiah, CA, Victorville, CA, Warsaw, IN, Watsonville, CA, Woodland, CA, Woodward, OK, Yankton, SD (155 cities)
4-S	Suburbs analogous to 4-C cities	Alcoa, TN, Arvada, CO, Barberton, OH, Bayonne, NJ, Berwyn, IL, Bessemer, AL, Bettendorf, IA, Birmingham, MI, Broken Arrow, OK, Campbell, CA, Carlsbad, CA, Carrollton, TX, Chelsea, MA, Chicopee, MA, Clifton, NJ, Compton, CA, Corona, CA, Covington, KY, Cranston, RI, Creve Coeur, MO, Crystal Lake, IL, Delray Beach, FL, East Chicago, IN, East Hartford, CT, East Providence, RI, Fairfield, CT, Farmington Hills, MI, Franklin Park, IL, Goshen, IN, Grand Prairie, TX, Granite City, IL, Gresham, OR, Gretna, LA, Highland Park, MI, Hillsboro, OR, Hoboken, NJ, Homestead, FL, Kenner, LA, Kent, OH, Kent, WA, Kirkland, WA, Kirkwood, MO, Lansdale, PA, Largo, FL, Layton, UT, Livermore, CA, McKeesport, PA, Medina, OH, Menomonee Falls, WI, Monrovia, CA, Montebello, CA, Morton Grove, IL, Mount Vernon, NY, Naperville, IL, Needham, MA, Neenah, WI, New Albany, IN, Newark, DE, New Kensington, PA, Newport, KY, Normal, IL, North Kansas City, MO, Norwalk, CA, Oak Park, IL, Olathe, KS, Oregon City, OR, Palm Beach, FL, Passaic, NJ, Pinellas Park, FL, Plainfield, NJ, Pleasanton, CA, Port Chester, NY, Redmond, WA, Richfield, MN, St. Louis Park, MN, Salem, VA, Sanford, FL, San Gabriel, CA, South Burlington, VT, South San Francisco, CA, Sparks, NV, Stratford, CT, Thornton, CO, Valley Stream, NY, West Chester, PA, Westfield, MA, West Haven, CT, West Memphis, AR, Westport, CT, Ypsilanti, MI (361 suburbs)

Notes: The B and C cities are secondary because they are in the same market area as a city rated A.

While those are only abstract examples of the ratings, consider how the system works in practice with the example of Ohio. Rand McNally conceives of Ohio as consisting of nineteen markets (trading areas) with some peripheral counties being contained in trading areas of other states. The table below shows the nineteen trading areas in order of hierarchy. Each has an A-rated city. Some also have other rated cities and suburbs.

Example: Ohio

Trading area	A-rated city	Other cities	Suburbs
Cleveland-Akron	Cleveland (1-AA)	Akron (2-BB), Wooster (3-C)	Elyria, Euclid, Lorain, Mentor, Middleburg Heights, Parma (all 3-S), Barberton, Beachwood, Bedford, Brooklyn, Cleveland Heights, Cuyahoga Falls, Fairlawn, Kent, Lakewood, Mayfield Heights, Medina, North Olmsted, Painesville, Ravenna, Richmond Heights, Willoughby (all 4-S)
Cincinnati	Cincinnati (1-A)	Hamilton (3-C), Middletown (3-C), Maysville, KY (4-C)	Florence, KY, Springdale,(both 3-S), Covington, KY, Fairfield, Newport, KY (all 4-S)
Columbus	Columbus (1-A)	Delaware, Lancaster, Newark (all 3-C), Mount Vernon (4-C)	Upper Arlington, Whitehall (both 4-S)
Dayton-Springfield	Dayton (2-AA)	Springfield (3-BB), Bellefontaine, Celina, Greenville, Piqua, Troy (all 4-C),	Trotwood, Xenia (both 4-S)
Toledo	Toledo (2-AA)	Bowling Green, Fremont (both 4-C)	Maumee (4-S)
Youngstown-Warren	Youngstown (2-AA)	Warren (3-B)	Niles (3-S)
Canton-New Philadelphia	Canton (2-A)	New Philadelphia (3-B), Dover (3-C), Alliance (4-C), Coshocton (4-C), Massillon (4-C)	
Lima	Lima (3-AA)		
Mansfield	Mansfield (3-AA)	Ashland (4-C)	Ontario (4-S)
Ashtabula	Ashtabula (3-A)		
Chillicothe	Chillicothe (3-A)		
Findlay-Tiffin	Findlay (3-A)	Tiffin (4-B)	
Marion	Marion (3-A)		
Portsmouth	Portsmouth (3-A)		
Sandusky	Sandusky (3-A)		
Steubenville-Weirton	Steubenville (3-A)	Weirton, WV (4-B)	
Zanesville-Cambridge	Zanesville (3-A)	Cambridge (4-B)	
Athens	Athens (4-A)		
East Liverpool-Salem	East Liverpool (4-A)	Salem (4-B)	

The system is applied by businesses seeking to serve a network of customers with the greatest efficiency. For example, a company that services elevators or a wholesaler of paper bags would want to locate its field representatives primarily in A rated cities. The Rural Health Research Center at the University of Minnesota published a report in 2008 on access to physicians in rural areas which uses the system to evaluate access to physicians in rural areas.

== See also ==
- Chinese city tier system
- Ecumenopolis
- Financial centre
- Global city
- Megalopolis
- Metropolis
- Primate city
