= Metropolitan Transit Authority =

Metropolitan Transit Authority may refer to:

- Metropolitan Transit Authority (Boston), succeeded by the Massachusetts Bay Transportation Authority (MBTA)
- Metropolitan Transit Authority (Victoria), Melbourne, Australia
- Erie Metropolitan Transit Authority, Pennsylvania
- Metropolitan Transit Authority of Harris County, Texas
- Metropolitan Transit Authority (Miami-Dade), Florida
- Nashville Metropolitan Transit Authority, doing business as WeGo Public Transit, Tennessee
- Topeka Metropolitan Transit Authority, Kansas

== See also ==
- Maryland Transit Administration, Maryland
- Metropolitan Transportation Authority, New York
- Los Angeles County Metropolitan Transportation Authority, California
- San Diego Metropolitan Transit System
- Réseau de transport métropolitain, Montreal, Canada
- MTA (disambiguation), for other things abbreviated "MTA"
- Metropolitan Transport Authority, Metropolis GZM, Poland
