= First‑tier city =

Unofficial hierarchical classification of Chinese cities

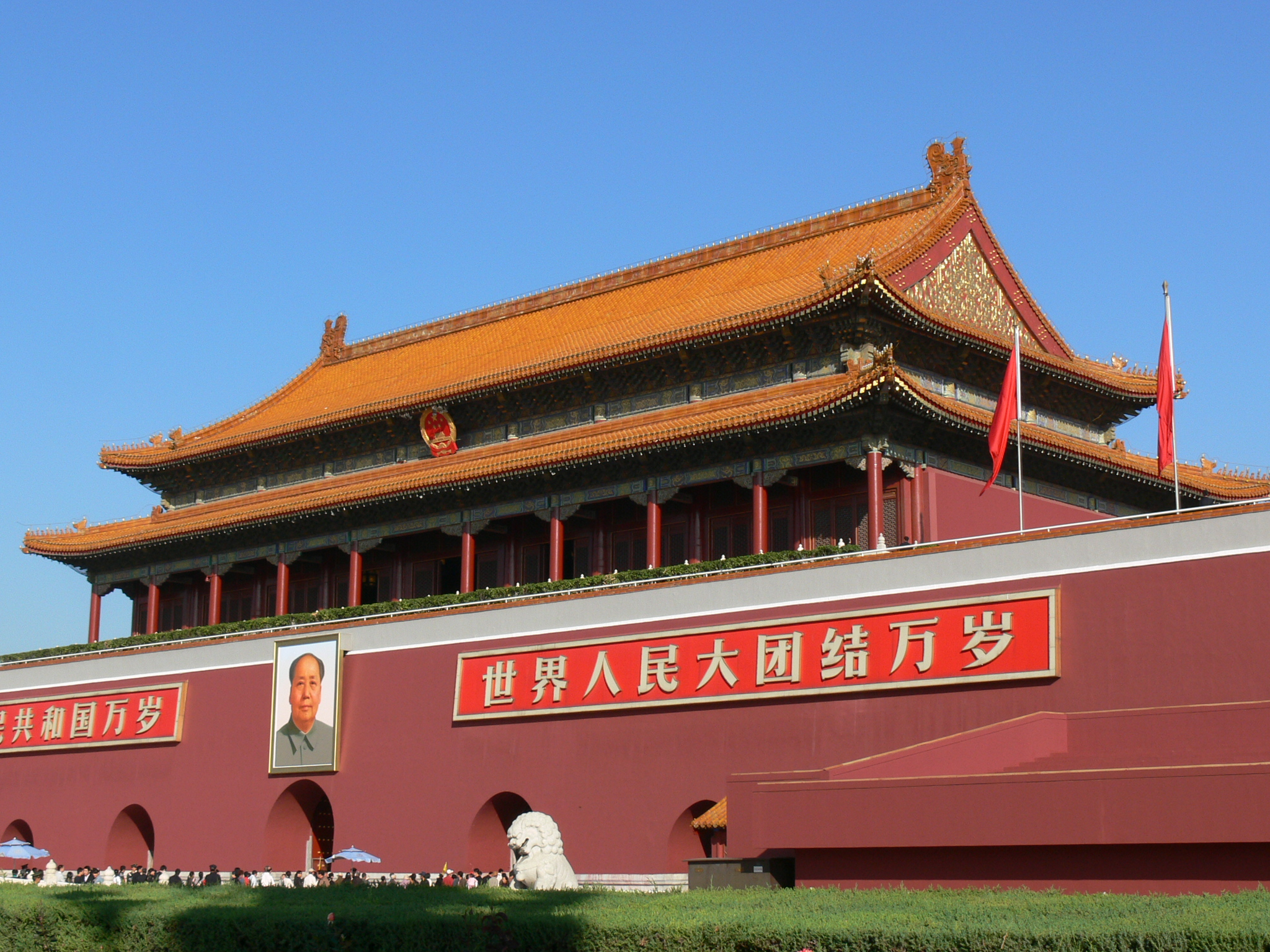
Beijing, a "tier-1" city

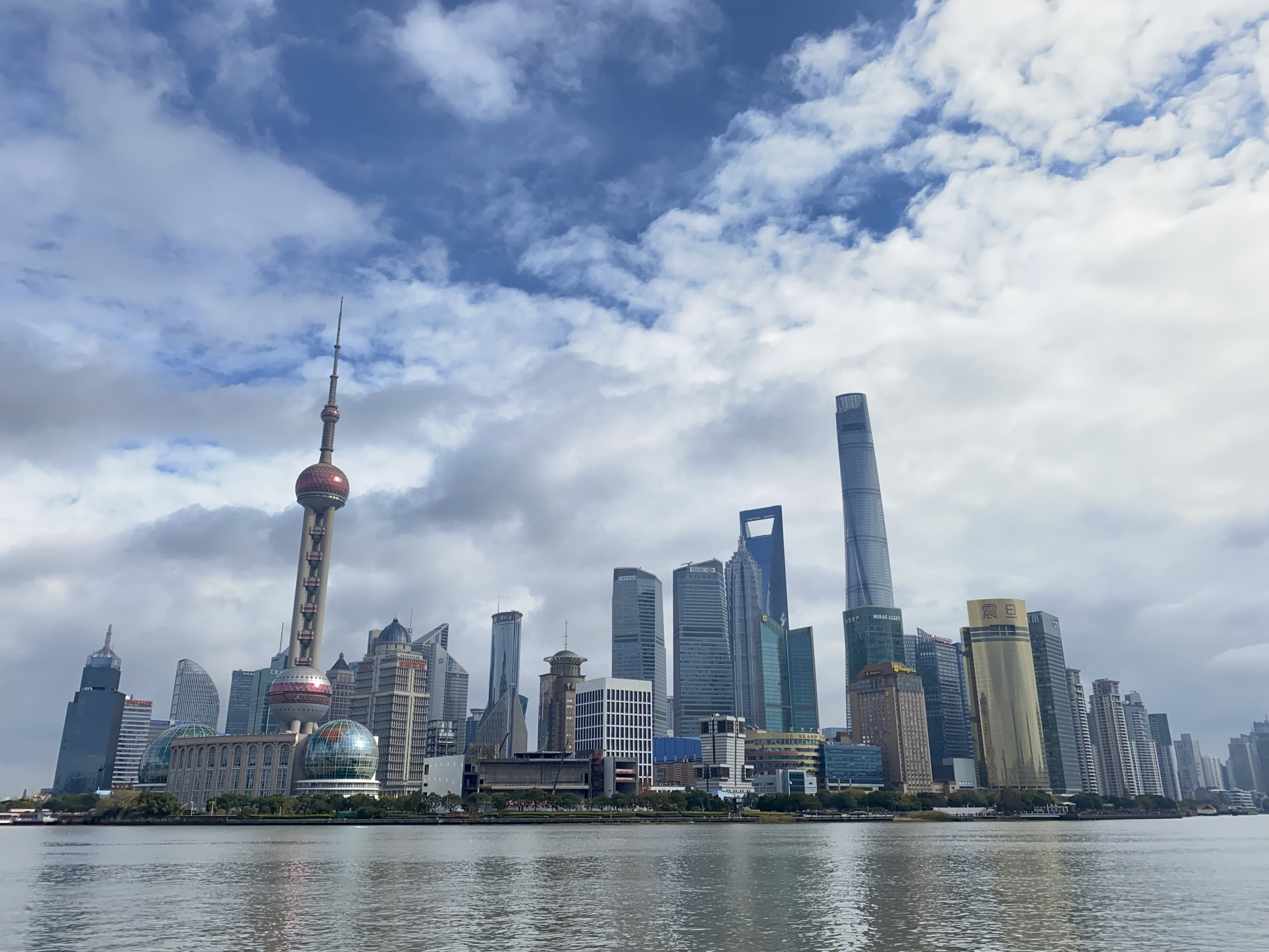
Shanghai, a "tier-1" city

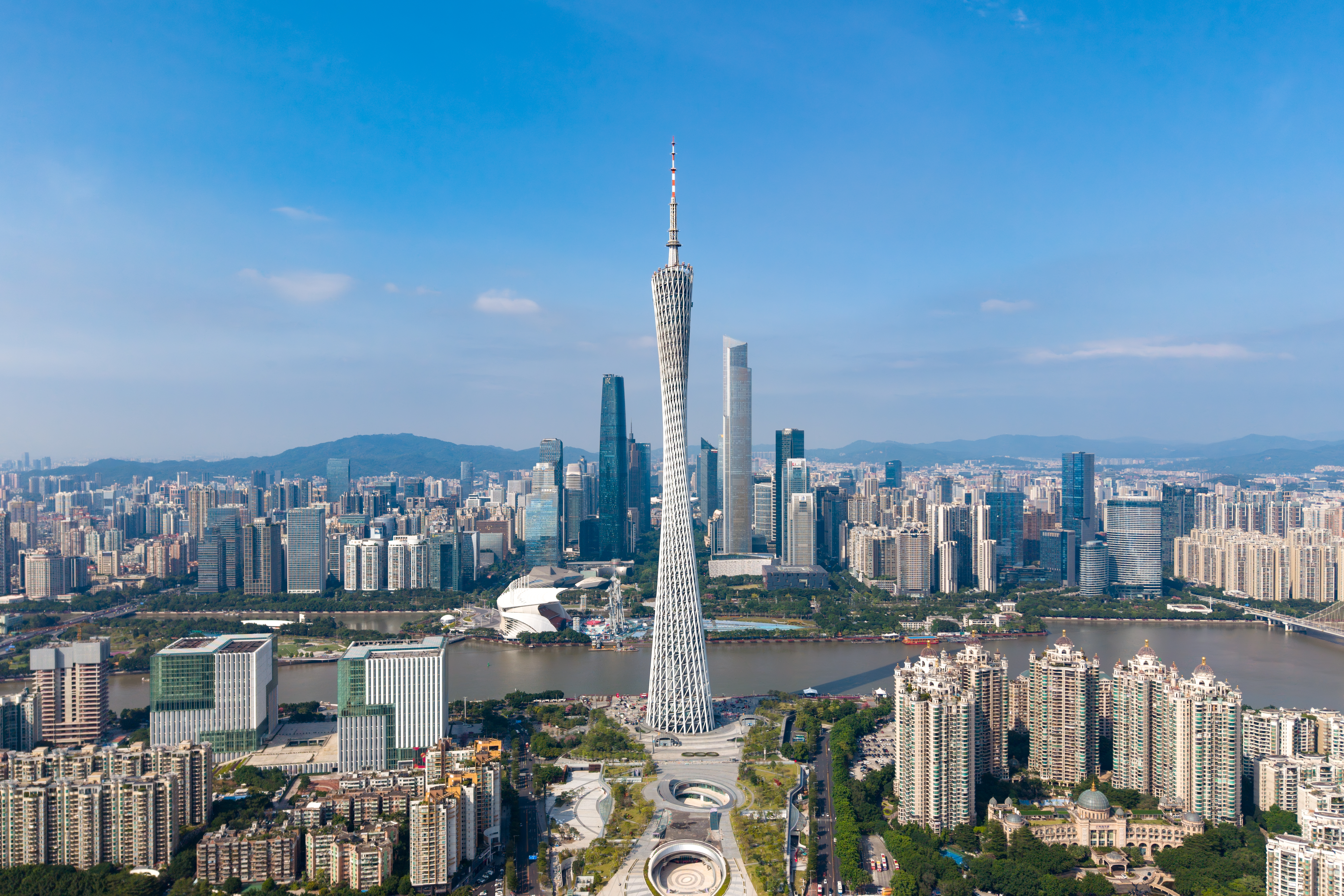
Guangzhou, a "tier-1" city

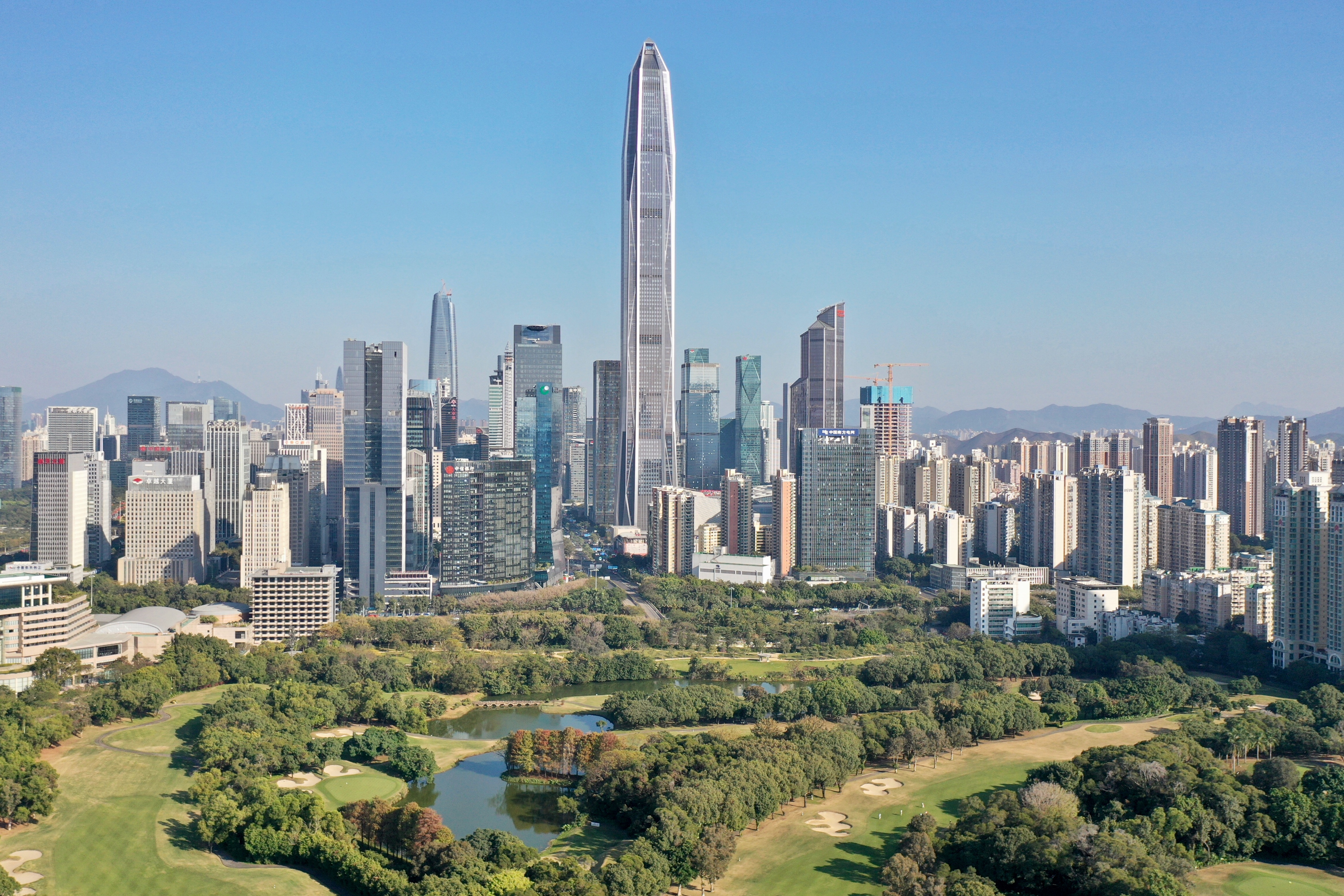
Shenzhen, a "tier-1" city

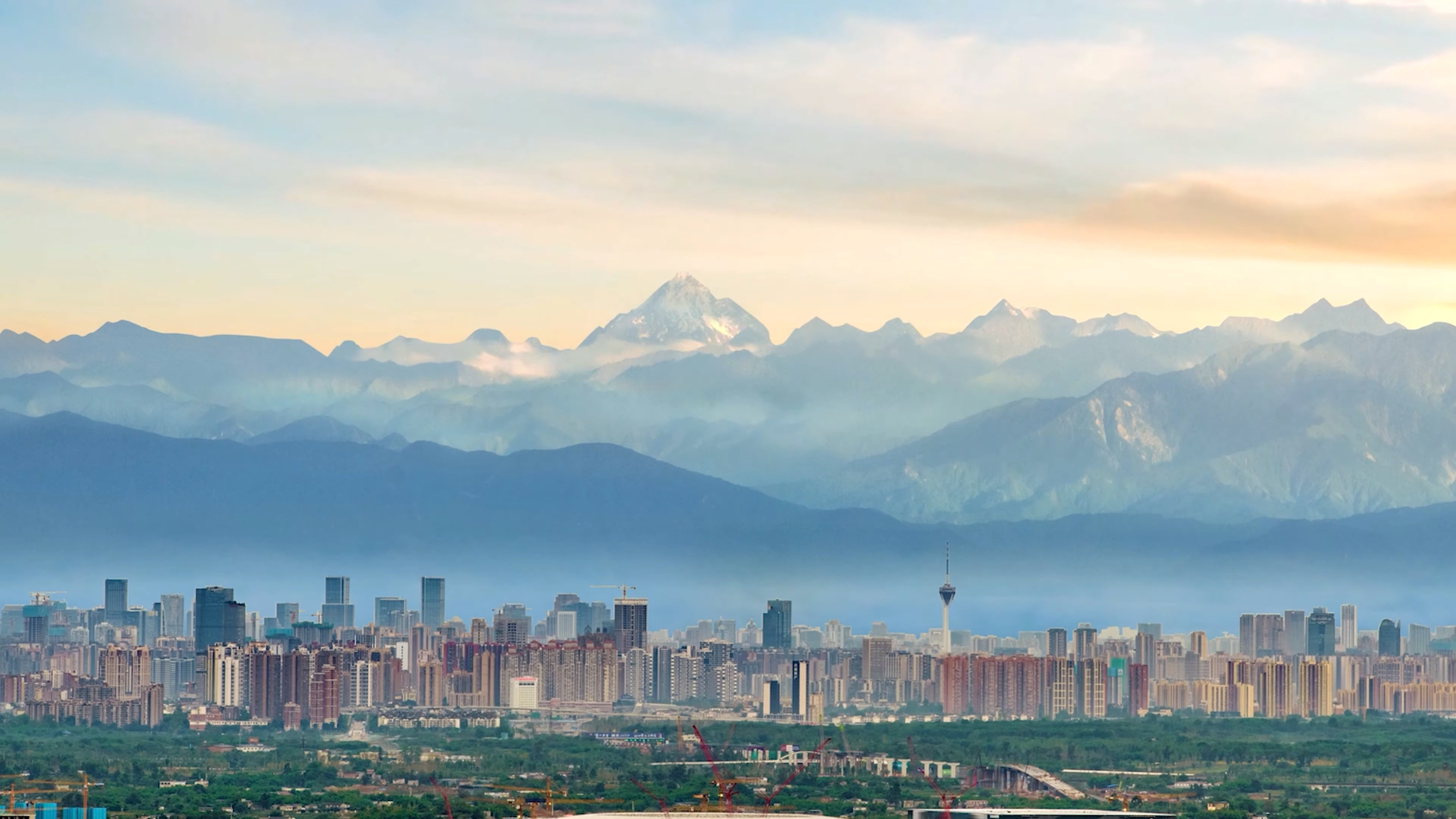
Chengdu, a "new tier-1" city

The first-tier cities (simplified Chinese: 一线城市; traditional Chinese: 一線城市; pinyin: yīxiàn chéngshì), or tier-1 cities, are the highest level cities in the unofficial urban classification system of the People's Republic of China. The most widely recognized first-tier cities in China mainland include Beijing, Shanghai, Guangzhou and Shenzhen.

In 2013, the Chinese financial magazine "CBN Weekly" proposed the concept of "new first-tier cities", which included 15 cities with the greatest potential to challenge the traditional first-tier cities.

== History ==
The tier-based classification of cities in China mainland originated in the estate market. In the mid‑2000s, according to many media publications, it was understood that there were four tiers, and the consensus was that four cities belonged to Tier 1: Beijing, Shanghai, Guangzhou, and Shenzhen (colloquially known as "Bei-Shang-Guang-Shen", Chinese: 北上广深). First-tier cities represent the most developed areas of the country with the most affluent and sophisticated consumers. They are large, densely populated urban metropolises that have huge economic, cultural and political influence in China.

In 2013, the Chinese financial magazine "CBN Weekly" proposed the concept of "new first-tier cities". It ranked and classified 400 cities nationwide based on a combination of indicators including per capita income, educational resources, and the selection of large companies and brands. The 15 cities with the greatest potential to become traditional first-tier cities were designated as "new first-tier cities", i.e., quasi-first-tier cities.

In 2017, there were 4 first-tier cities in the order of: Beijing, Shanghai, Guangzhou, Shenzhen; and 15 new first-tier cities in the order of: Chengdu, Hangzhou, Wuhan, Chongqing, Nanjing, Tianjin, Suzhou, Xi'an, Changsha, Shenyang, Qingdao, Zhengzhou, Dalian, Dongguan, Ningbo.

In the ranking history so far, the four first‑tier cities remain Beijing, Shanghai, Guangzhou and Shenzhen. The "new first‑tier" ranking list is updated annually.

In 2025, the order the 4 first-tier cities is "Shanghai, Beijing, Shenzhen, Guangzhou"; followed by 15 new first‑tier cities (in the order of: "Chengdu, Hangzhou, Chongqing, Wuhan, Suzhou, Xi'an, Nanjing, Changsha, Zhengzhou, Tianjin, Hefei, Qingdao, Dongguan, Ningbo and Foshan").

== Criteria ==
The classification of first-tier cities relies on their economic competitiveness and the level of industrial and commercial development. In 2024 and 2025, Yicai (formerly CBN Weekly) used a system of five indexes:

- Concentration of Commercial Resources Index,
- City as a Hub Index,
- Urban Residents' Activity Index,
- New Economy Competitiveness Index, and
- Future Potential Index.

In the past, the criterion of Lifestyle Diversity Index used to be used, including factors like the number of museums, cafes, consumption diversity, and the number of travel destinations.

== Traditional first-tier cities ==
The most widely recognized first-tier cities in mainland China include

- Beijing (the capital),
- Shanghai (a municipality directly under the central government),
- Guangzhou (the capital of Guangdong Province), and
- Shenzhen (a special economic zone),

collectively known as "Bei-Shang-Guang-Shen". They are China's most economically developed and globally influential cities, with the characteristics of: high GDP, large population, advanced infrastructure, high living costs and property prices, strong consumer purchasing power, well-developed financial and information technology sectors, and large expatriate communities and international business presence.

Since the 2010s, Guangdong Province, where Guangzhou and Shenzhen are located, along with Beijing and Shanghai, has ranked among the top three of the six provincial-level administrative regions that can provide fiscal surpluses to the central government. In 2016, Shanghai, Beijing, and Shenzhen provided the central government with a fiscal surplus of 1.6989 trillion yuan, more than half of the total fiscal surplus of 3.0373 trillion yuan from the six provinces and municipalities. These fiscal surpluses were used by the central government for fiscal transfer payments to 25 provinces and municipalities across the country to maintain the fiscal balance of local governments.

An unofficial list published by the South China Morning Post ranks 613 Chinese cities on four tiers. This list uses a variety of parameters as the basis of classification: population size, GDP, and administrative hierarchy. The Tier 1 cities consisted of Beijing, Shanghai, Guangzhou, Tianjin and Chongqing.

== New first-tier cities ==
The "Ranking of New First-Tier Cities" published by Yicai (formerly CBN Weekly) now ranks new first-tier cities based on five criteria: Concentration of Commercial Resources Index, City as a Hub Index, Urban Residents' Activity Index, New Economy Competitiveness Index, and Future Potential Index.

Ranking of New First-Tier Cities
Rank	2013	2016	2017	2018	2019	2020	2021	2022	2023	2024	2025
1	Chengdu	Chengdu（-）	Chengdu（-）	Chengdu（-）	Chengdu（-）	Chengdu（-）	Chengdu（-）	Chengdu（-）	Chengdu（-）	Chengdu（-）	Chengdu（-）
2	Hangzhou	Hangzhou（-）	Hangzhou（-）	Hangzhou（-）	Hangzhou（-）	Chongqing（+1）	Hangzhou（+1）	Chongqing（+1）	Chongqing（-）	Hangzhou（+1）	Hangzhou（-）
3	Nanjing	Wuhan（+1）	Wuhan（-）	Chongqing（+1）	Chongqing（-）	Hangzhou（-1）	Chongqing（-1）	Hangzhou（-1）	Hangzhou（-）	Chongqing（-1）	Chongqing（-）
4	Wuhan	Tianjin（+1）	Chongqing（+2）	Wuhan（-1）	Wuhan（-）	Wuhan（-）	Xi'an（+1）	Xi'an（-）	Wuhan（+1）	Suzhou（+1）	Wuhan（+1）
5	Tianjin	Nanjing（-2）	Nanjing（-）	Suzhou（+2）	Xi'an（+1）	Xi'an（-）	Suzhou（+2）	Wuhan（+1）	Suzhou（+1）	Wuhan（-1）	Suzhou（-1）
6	Xi'an	Chongqing（+1）	Tianjin（-2）	Xi'an（+2）	Suzhou（-1）	Tianjin（+1）	Wuhan（-2）	Suzhou（-1）	Xi'an（-2）	Xi'an（-）	Xi'an（-）
7	Chongqing	Xi'an（-1）	Suzhou（+6）	Tianjin（-1）	Tianjin（-）	Suzhou（-1）	Nanjing（+1）	Zhengzhou（+2）	Nanjing（+1）	Nanjing（-）	Nanjing（-）
8	Qingdao	Changsha（+2）	Xi'an（-1）	Nanjing（-3）	Nanjing（-）	Nanjing（-）	Tianjin（-2）	Nanjing（-1）	Changsha（+2）	Changsha（-）	Changsha（-）
9	Shengyang	Qingdao（-1）	Changsha（-1）	Zhengzhou（+3）	Changsha（+1）	Zhengzhou（+1）	Zhengzhou（-）	Tianjin（-1）	Tianjin（-）	Tianjin（-）	Zhengzhou（+1）
10	Changsha	Shengyang（-1）	Shengyang（-）	Changsha（-1）	Zhengzhou（-1）	Changsha（-1）	Changsha（-）	Changsha（-）	Zhengzhou（-3）	Zhengzhou（-）	Tianjin（-1）
11	Dalian	Dalian（-）	Qingdao（-2）	Shengyang（-1）	Dongguan（+3）	Dongguan（-）	Dongguan（-）	Dongguan（-）	Dongguan（-）	Dongguan（-）	Hefei（+4）
12	Xiamen	Xiamen（-）	Zhengzhou（new）	Qingdao（-1）	Qingdao（-）	Shengyang（+1）	Foshan（+3）	Ningbo（+1）	Qingdao（+3）	Wuxi（re）	Qingdao（+2）
13	Wuxi	Suzhou（new）	Dalian（-2）	Ningbo（+2）	Shengyang（-2）	Qingdao（-1）	Ningbo（re）	Foshan]（-1）	Kunming（re）	Ningbo（+1）	Dongguan（-2）
14	Fuzhou	Ningbo（new）	Dongguan（new）	Dongguan（-）	Ningbo（-1）	Hefei（new）	Qingdao（-1）	Hefei（re）	Ningbo（-2）	Qingdao（-2）	Ningbo（-1）
15	Jinan	Wuxi（-2）	Ningbo（-1）	Wuxi（re）	Kunming（new）	Foshan（new）	Shengyang（-3）	Qingdao（-1）	Hefei（-1）	Hefei（-）	Foshan（re）

The characteristics of the new first-tier cities include: "Expanding middle-class consumer base; Rising investment in technology, innovation, and startups; Competitive salaries and business opportunities; Lower operational costs compared to first-tier cities."

In 2022, an article by the State Council Information Office of China ranked Beijing, Shanghai, Shenzhen, and Guangzhou as first-tier cities. And there were nine quasi first-tier cities including Chengdu, Hangzhou, Chongqing, Nanjing, Suzhou, Wuhan, Tianjin, Xiamen, and Xi'an.

== Other tiers ==
Some classify other municipalities, sub-provincial cities, provincial capitals, and economically developed prefecture-level cities as second- or third-tier cities, while classifying other ordinary prefecture-level cities and economically developed counties, county-level cities, and towns as fourth- or fifth-tier cities.

There is a humorous self-deprecating term in online culture: "18th-tier city" or "18th-tier small city".

== See also ==
- Chinese city tier system
- Global city

== Criticism ==
Some critics say that the ranking harms lower-ranked cities, and favors large cities.
