= Chinese city tier system =

Unofficial hierarchical classification of Chinese cities

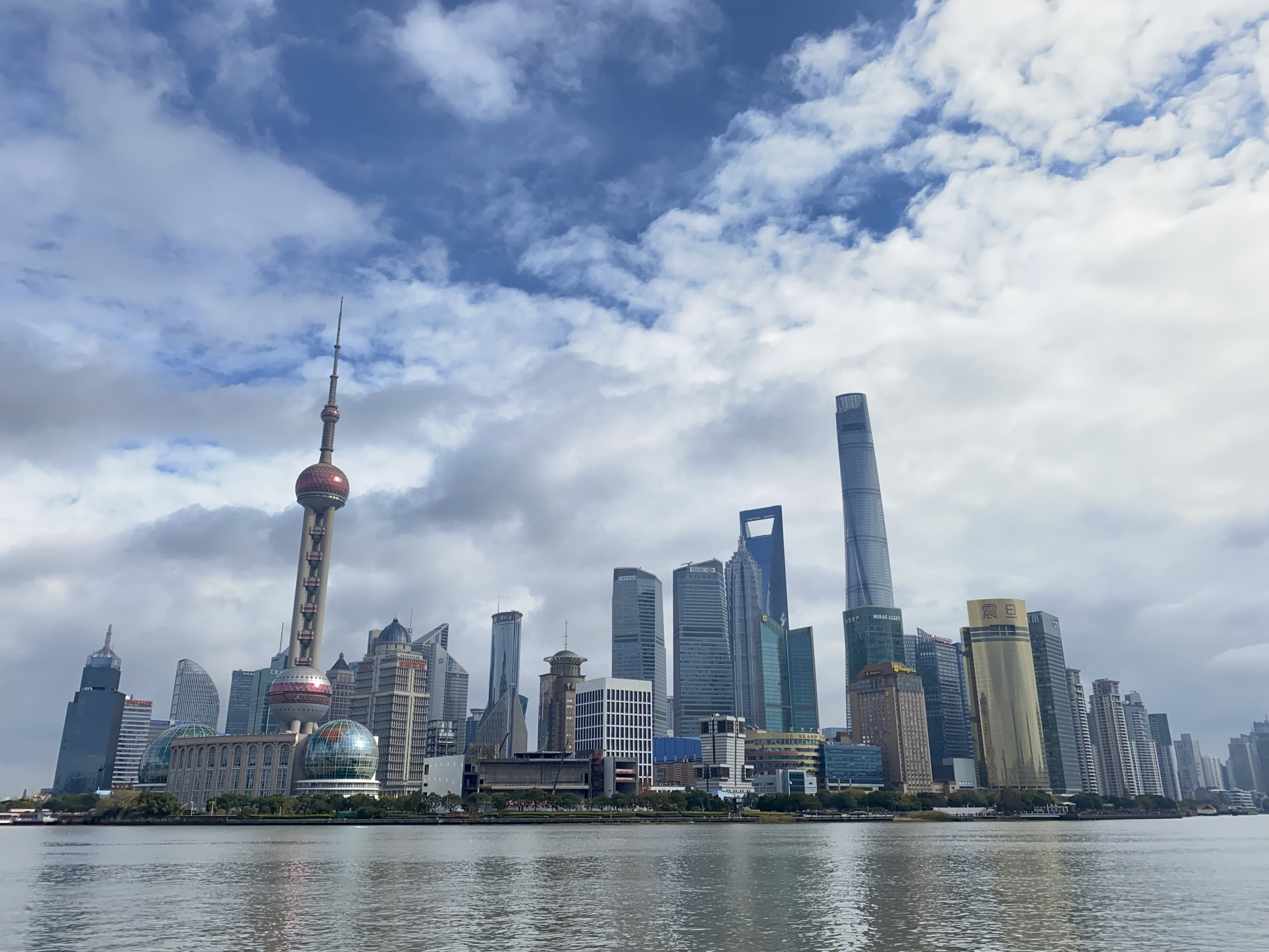
Shanghai, a "Tier 1" city

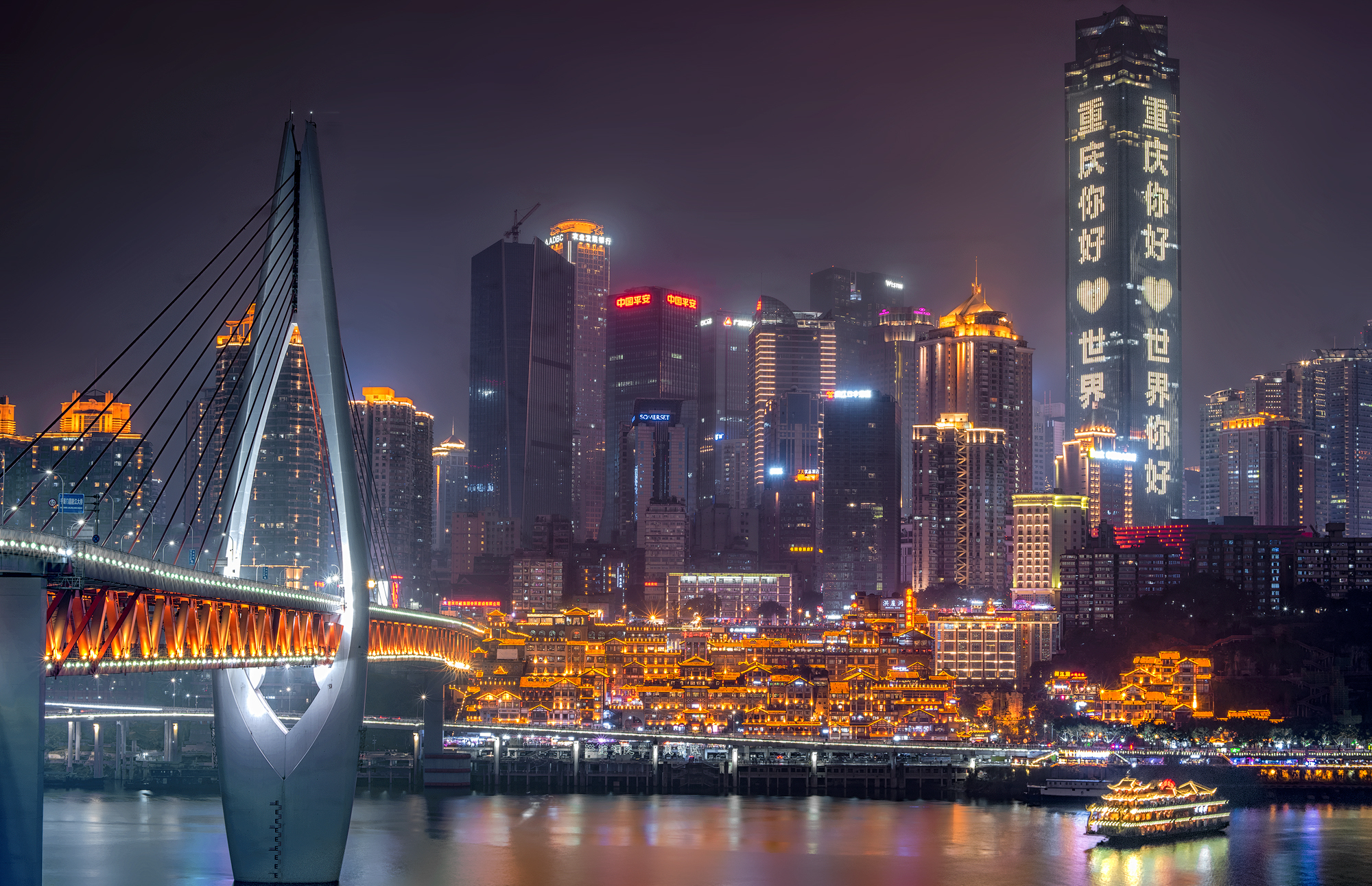
Chongqing, a "New Tier 1" city

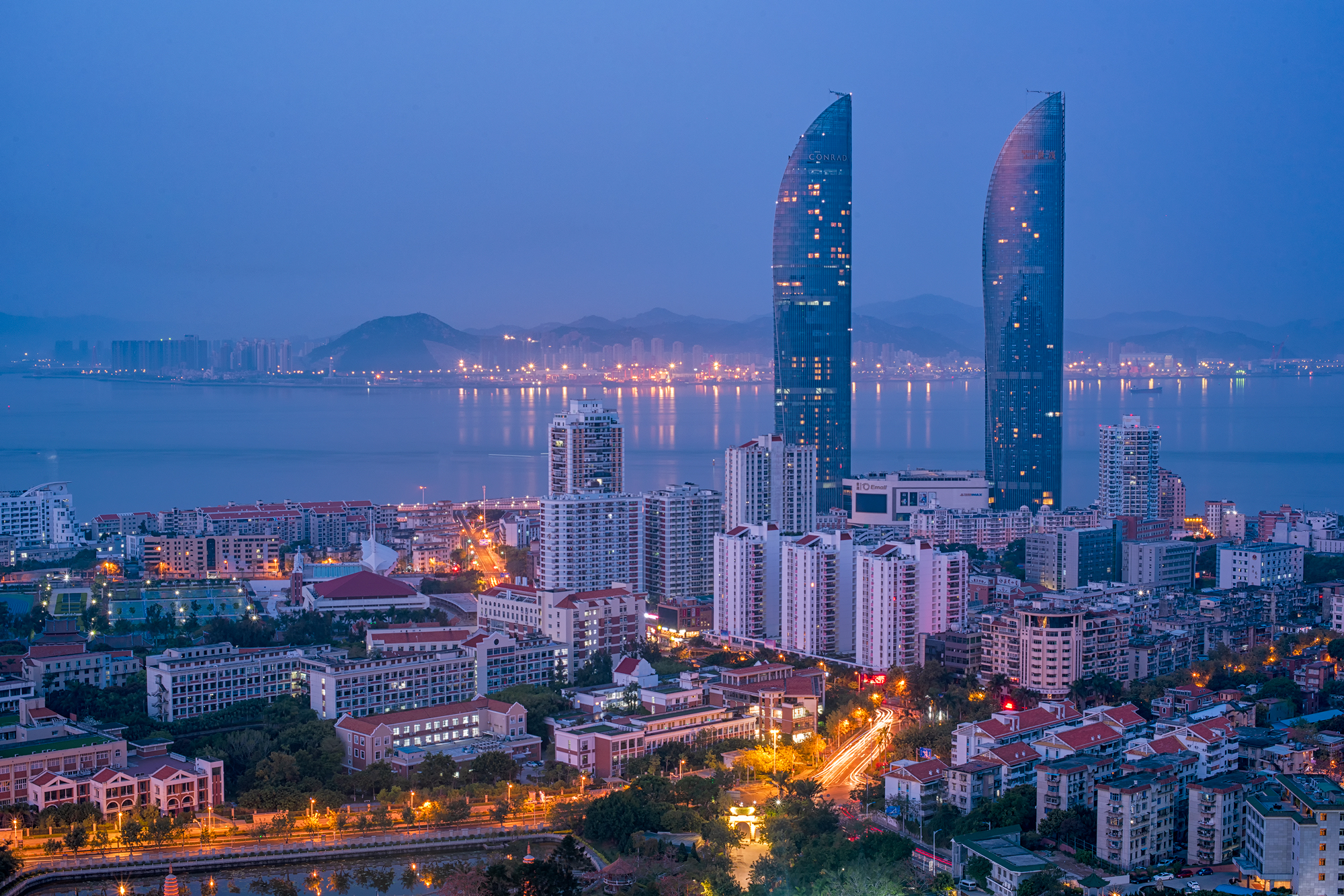
Xiamen, a "Tier 2" city

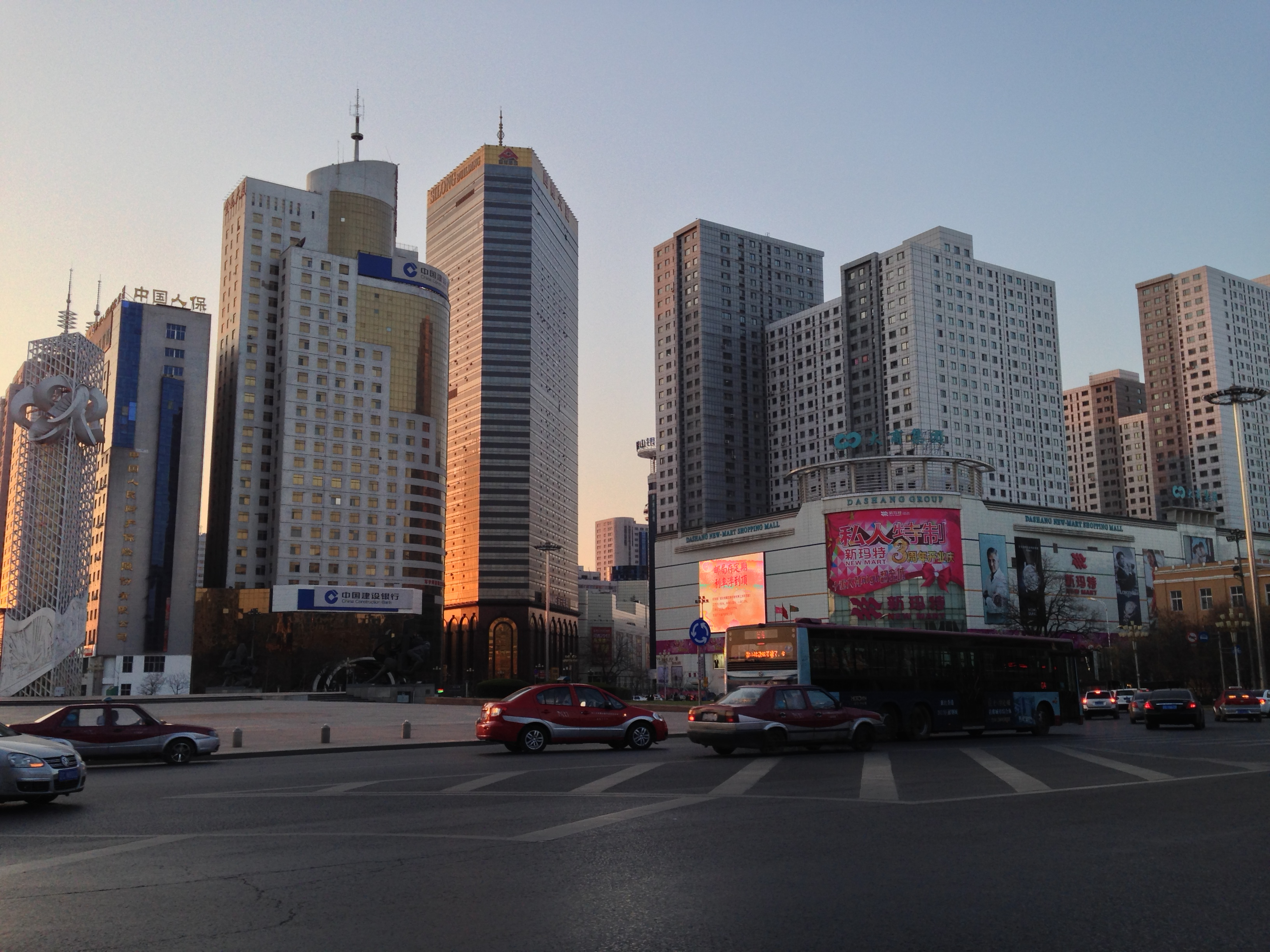
Anshan, a "Tier 3" city

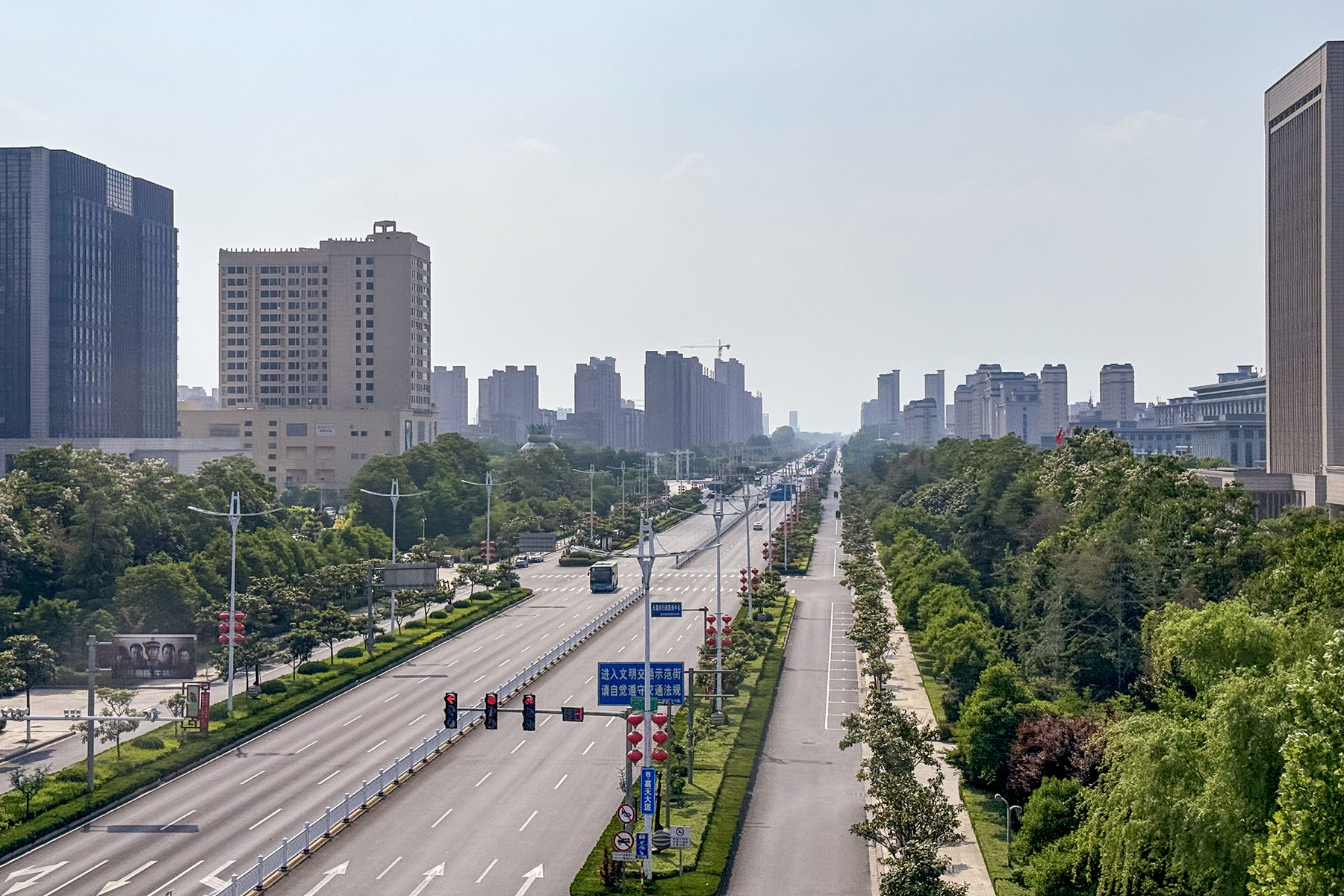
Xuchang, a "Tier 4" city

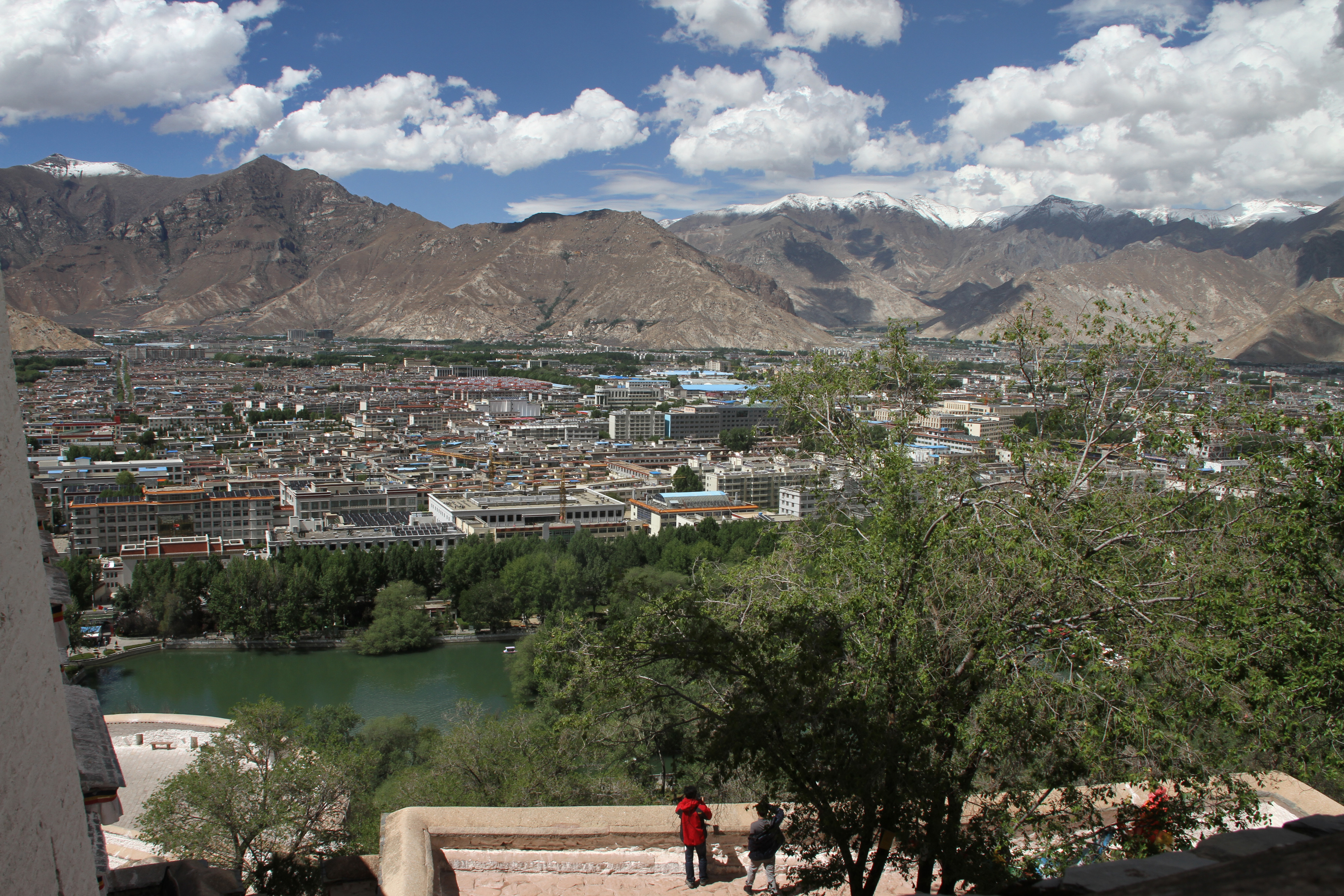
Lhasa, a "Tier 5" city

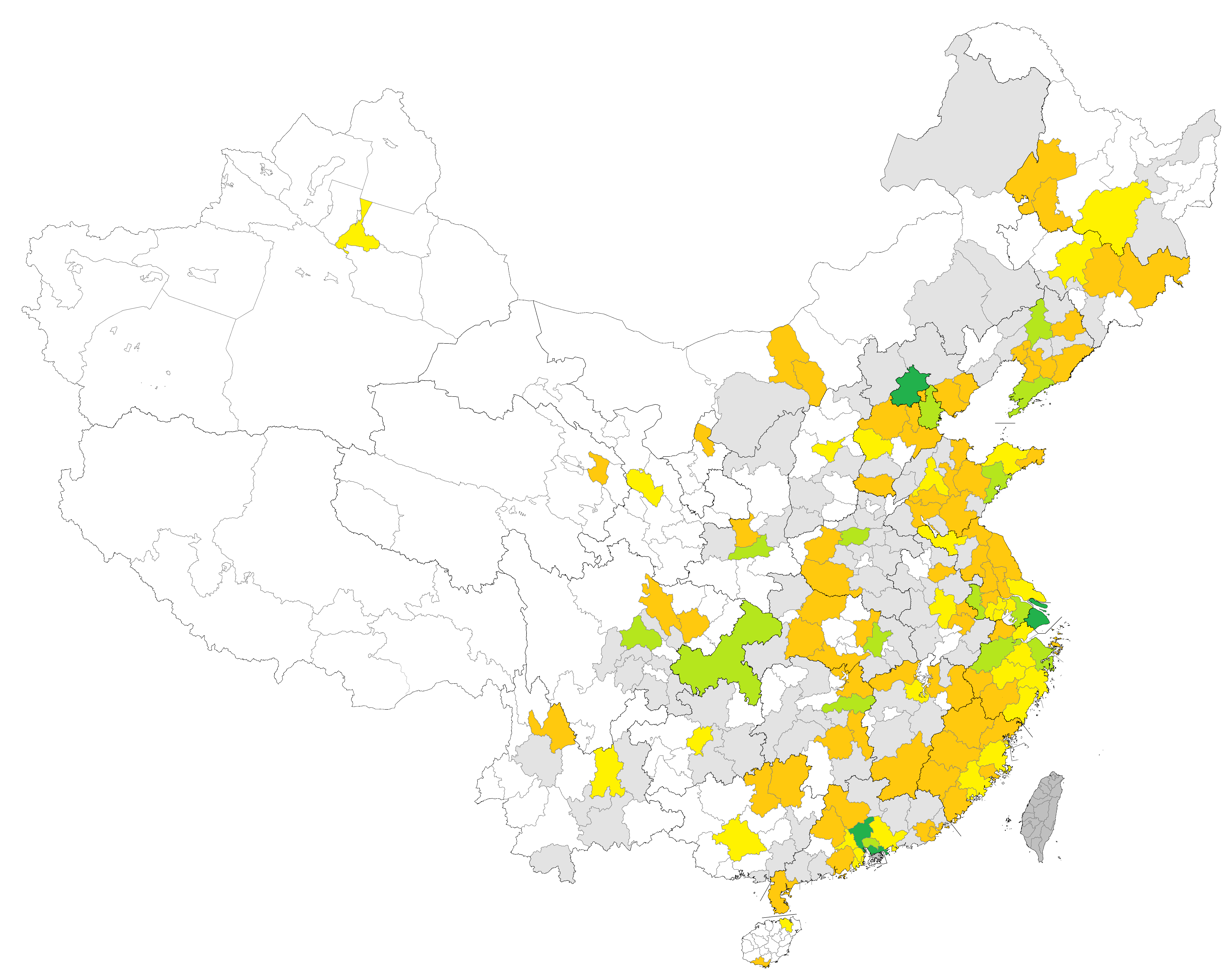
A map of Chinese cities by tier, according to Yicai Global 2017.: Tier 1; New Tier 1; Tier 2; Tier 3; Tier 4; Tier 5

The Chinese city tier system (Chinese: 中国城市等级制; pinyin: Zhōngguó chéngshì děngjízhì; lit. 'Chinese city hierarchy') is an unofficial hierarchical classification of Chinese cities in the People's Republic of China (PRC). There are no such official lists in the country, as the Chinese government does not publish or recognize any official definition or a list of cities included in the tier system. However, it is frequently referred to by various international media publications for purposes including commerce, transportation, tourism and education, among others.

Given the rapid development of Chinese cities ever since the economic reform and the ever-changing dynamics among the country's cities, the tier system has gained wide popularity in recent years as a point of reference, such as among investors and tourists. Cities in different tiers often reflect differences in consumer behavior, income level, population size, consumer sophistication, infrastructure, talent pool, and business opportunity, among others.

The tier system typically includes prefectural-level divisions in mainland China, which include prefecture-level cities, autonomous prefectures, prefectures, and leagues. The special administrative regions (SARs) of Hong Kong and Macau are not included on the list.

== Background ==
Many economists, consultants and businesses classify cities in China based on the tier system. Businesses frequently refer to the tier system in, for example, devising marketing strategy, as it is understood that treating China as one market is simply not feasible: consumers from different regions and cities have vastly different income levels, behaviors, and trends. Cities in different tiers also differ greatly in population size, infrastructure, and the level of sophistication in products and services.

Given the sheer number of cities in China, there is not a single version of this classification. According to many media publications, it is understood that there are four tiers, and the consensus is that four cities belong to Tier-1 (Chinese: 一线城市; pinyin: yīxiàn chéngshì): Beijing, Shanghai, Guangzhou, and Shenzhen (colloquially known as “Bei-Shang-Guang-Shen”, 北上广深). First-tier cities represent the most developed areas of the country with the most affluent and sophisticated consumers. They are large, densely populated urban metropolises that have huge economic, cultural and political influence in China.

== Classification ==
=== Yicai Global ===
In 2017, Yicai Global, a financial magazine, published an unofficial tiered list of the Most Commercially Charming Cities in China, ranking 338 Chinese cities above or at the prefectural level based on the latest business data from 160 commercial brands, customer behavior data from 17 internet companies and Big Data on cities compiled by research institutions. The new ranking assessed the commercial attractiveness of 338 cities drawing from data on five dimensions: (1) concentration of commercial resources, (2) the extent to which a city serves as a commercial hub, (3) vitality of urban residents, (4) diversity of lifestyle, (5) future dynamism. The list below shows Yicai Global's 2017 classification, which contains 338 cities ranked on 6 tiers: tier 1, new tier 1, tier 2, tier 3, tier 4, and tier 5.

A "city" in China may refer to an administrative unit at different levels. In short, while there are 334 prefectural-level units in China, there are 2,851 units at the county level, and 39,864 units at the township level. This list includes only units at the prefectural level, the second highest administrative division in China. A "prefectural-level" administrative unit can be a city, a prefecture, an autonomous prefecture, and a league. The four direct municipalities, Beijing, Shanghai, Chongqing, and Tianjin are also considered cities even though they are officially provincial-level administrative units. It is for these reasons that Yicai Global's published list includes 338 "cities": namely all of the 334 prefectural-level units plus the 4 direct municipalities.

Top 3 Tiers of Prefectural-level Chinese Cities by Yicai Global 2017
Tier	Cities (Notes: because many cities in China have names that appear identical in pinyin, the list below includes city names written in Chinese characters to help differentiate)	Number of cities	Total estimated urban population (2021) in millions
Tier 1	Beijing, Shanghai, Guangzhou, Shenzhen 北京市、上海市、广州市、深圳市	4	75
New Tier 1	Chengdu, Kunming, Chongqing, Hangzhou, Wuhan, Nanjing, Tianjin, Suzhou, Xi'an, Changsha, Shenyang, Qingdao, Zhengzhou, Dalian, Dongguan, Ningbo 成都市、昆明市、重庆市、杭州市、武汉市、南京市、天津市、苏州市、西安市、长沙市、沈阳市、青岛市、郑州市、大连市、东莞市、宁波市	15	122
Tier 2	Xiamen, Fuzhou, Wuxi, Hefei, Harbin, Jinan, Foshan, Changchun, Wenzhou, Shijiazhuang, Nanning, Changzhou, Quanzhou, Nanchang, Guiyang, Taiyuan, Yantai, Jiaxing, Nantong, Jinhua, Zhuhai, Huizhou, Xuzhou, Haikou, Ürümqi, Shaoxing, Zhongshan, Taizhou, Jiujiang 厦门市、福州市、无锡市、合肥市、哈尔滨市、济南市、佛山市、长春市、温州市、石家庄市、南宁市、常州市、泉州市、南昌市、贵阳市、太原市、烟台市、嘉兴市、南通市、金华市、珠海市、惠州市、徐州市、海口市、乌鲁木齐市、绍兴市、中山市、台州市、九江市	30	218
Tier 3	Weifang, Baoding, Zhenjiang, Yangzhou, Guilin, Tangshan, Sanya, Huzhou, Hohhot, Langfang, Luoyang, Weihai, Yancheng, Linyi, Jiangmen, Shantou, Taizhou, Zhangzhou, Handan, Jining, Wuhu, Zibo, Yinchuan, Liuzhou, Mianyang, Zhanjiang, Anshan, Ganzhou, Daqing, Yichang, Baotou, Xianyang, Qinhuangdao, Zhuzhou, Putian, Jilin, Huai'an, Zhaoqing, Ningde, Hengyang, Nanping, Lianyungang, Dandong, Lijiang, Jieyang, Yanbian Korean Autonomous Prefecture, Zhoushan, Lanzhou, Longyan, Luzhou, Fushun, Xiangyang, Shangrao, Yingkou, Sanming, Lishui, Yueyang, Qingyuan, Jingzhou, Tai'an, Quzhou, Panjin, Dongying, Nanyang, Ma'anshan, Nanchong, Xining, Xiaogan, Qiqihar 潍坊市、保定市、镇江市、扬州市、桂林市、唐山市、三亚市、湖州市、呼和浩特市、廊坊市、洛阳市、威海市、盐城市、临沂市、江门市、汕头市、泰州市、漳州市、邯郸市、济宁市、芜湖市、淄博市、银川市、柳州市、绵阳市、湛江市、鞍山市、赣州市、大庆市、宜昌市、包头市、咸阳市、秦皇岛市、株洲市、莆田市、吉林市、淮安市、肇庆市、宁德市、衡阳市、南平市、连云港市、丹东市、丽江市、揭阳市、延边朝鲜族自治州、舟山市、兰州市、龙岩市、沧州市、抚顺市、襄阳市、上饶市、营口市、三明市、蚌埠市、丽水市、岳阳市、清远市、荆州市、泰安市、衢州市、盘锦市、东营市、南阳市、马鞍山市、南充市、西宁市、孝感市、齐齐哈尔市	71	305

=== South China Morning Post ===
An unofficial list published by the South China Morning Post ranks 613 Chinese cities on four tiers. This list uses a variety of parameters as the basis of classification: population size, GDP, and administrative hierarchy. According to the South China Morning Post, the Tier 1 Chinese cities consist of Beijing, Shanghai, Guangzhou, Tianjin, and Chongqing.

Top Tier of Prefectural-level Chinese Cities by South China Morning Post
Tier	Cities (Notes: because many cities in China have names that appear identical in pinyin, the list below includes city names written in Chinese characters to help differentiate)	Number of cities
Tier 1	Beijing, Shanghai, Chongqing, Guangzhou, Tianjin 北京市、上海市、重庆市、广州市、天津市	5

== Criticism ==
Some argue that the tier system limits opportunities for cities that are not ranked among higher tiers. Robert Lawrence Kuhn, an American investment banker and author of How China’s Leaders Think, argues that the so-called “second-tier” cities should actually be called “first-class opportunities,” given that these cities have been growth engines of the Chinese economy, boosted by huge amounts of investment, new infrastructure and an influx of new talent. Kuhn says that "roughly 170 Chinese cities have more than one million residents, but only five – Shanghai, Beijing, Tianjin, Guangzhou and Shenzhen – are considered “first-tier” in terms of size and per capita Gross Domestic Product. Some of these metropolises have populations that exceed that of many countries and are world-class in every way."

== See also ==
- First‑tier city
- Global city
- National central city
- Ranally city rating system
