= Biological terrain assessment =

Set of tests

The biological terrain assessment or BTA is a set of tests used to measure the pH, resistivity, and redox of a person's urine, blood, and saliva. The measurements were first used by L.C. Vincent, a French hydrologist, in the early 1900s. It is often associated with homeopathy and holistic health. The test's usefulness is debatable, and according to physician Stephen Barrett, BTA is outdated, apart from pH measurement, and is an inferior assessment technique that should not be favored over more modern techniques.

== Usefulness ==
Proponents of the BTA claim that comparing the pH, resistivity, and redox of the blood, urine, and saliva provides a health practitioner with an indication of the metabolic processes inside the body. There is no scientific evidence that these measurements provide a medically relevant indication of metabolic processes. Multiple manufacturers of BTA equipment have been prevented from selling their equipment in the United States because they lack Food and Drug Administration (FDA) approval. However, the FDA has not stated whether the BTA is medically useful.

The Quantitative Fluid Analyzer (QFA) manufactured by Health Science Company does have FDA classification as a "laboratory instrument for medical purposes" "ion selective", Class 1 510(K) exempt. However it does not have CLIA (Clinical Laboratory improvement Amendment, 1988) waiver.
