= Mid-term adjustment =

Change to an insurance policy's terms, cover, or premium made during the policy period

In insurance, a mid-term adjustment (MTA), also called a mid-term modification or mid-term change, refers to a change to an insurance policy prior to the end of the policy period (when coverage is offered).

The change to the policy may cause a change in the premium: an increase is often called AP (for an additional premium) whereas a decrease is often called RP (returned premium).

An additional transaction may also be payable to cover e.g. costs for revised insurance documents. Some insurers also use this fee to discourage changes, although few openly admit this.

A cancellation is often treated as a special-case MTA, where the cover decreases to zero. Such transactions may attract special fees too.
