= Microsoft Technology Associate =

Microsoft Technology Associate was an entry-level certification that validates fundamental technology skills and knowledge in Microsoft products. MTA exams were designed to assess and validate core technical concepts in three primary areas: Databases (MS SQL Server), Development (Visual Studio) and IT Infrastructure (Windows, Windows Server). MTA exams and certification were offered as part of the Microsoft Certified Professional (MCP) program.

All exams were retired on June 30, 2022.

== Retired exam list ==
As of October 7, 2019, the retired Microsoft Technology Associate exams are:

Exam Track	Exam Product	Exam Number	Exam Name	Retirement Day
Development	Visual Studio	98-373	Mobile Development Fundamentals	July 31, 2014
Development	Visual Studio	98-362	Windows Development Fundamentals	July 31, 2014
Development	Visual Studio	98-363	Web Development Fundamentals	July 31, 2015
Development	Visual Studio	98-372	.NET Fundamentals	July 31, 2015
Development	Visual Studio	98-374	Gaming Development Fundamentals	July 31, 2015
Development	Visual Studio	98-379	Software Testing Fundamentals	July 31, 2016
IT	None	98-369	Cloud Fundamentals	September 30, 2019
IT	Windows	98-349	Windows Operating System Fundamentals	June 30, 2022
IT	Windows Server 2016	98-365	Windows Server Administration Fundamentals	June 30, 2022
IT	None	98-366	Networking Fundamentals	June 30, 2022
IT	None	98-367	Security Fundamentals	June 30, 2022
IT	None	98-368	Mobility and Device Fundamentals	June 30, 2022
Database	Microsoft SQL Server	98-364	Database Fundamentals	June 30, 2022
Development	Visual Studio	98-361	Software Development Fundamentals	June 30, 2022
Development	Visual Studio	98-375	HTML5 App Development Fundamentals	June 30, 2022
Development	Visual Studio	98-381	Introduction to Programming Using Python	June 30, 2022
Development	Visual Studio	98-382	Introduction to Programming Using JavaScript	June 30, 2022
Development	Visual Studio	98-383	Introduction to Programming Using HTML and CSS	June 30, 2022
Development	Visual Studio	98-388	Introduction to Programming Using Java	June 30, 2022

== Exam availability ==
The Microsoft Technology Associate exams could be scheduled with two exam providers:

- Certiport for students, educators and schools
- Pearson VUE

There are multiple differences about scheduling an exam with Certiport or Pearson VUE such as:

- In Pearson VUE, you need to have two identification documents while in Certiport, you need to have only one
- In Pearson VUE, they take a photo of you and they want a digital signature while in Certiport you don't have to do it
- Outside the United States, there is a restriction with voucher availability in some countries. For example, the Greek Authorized Partner of Certiport can give vouchers only to testing centers and not to candidates while in Pearson VUE you can purchase the voucher online via VUE's site.
- In Pearson VUE testing centers, there are testing days and hours very often while in Certiport, there is one exam datetime per 15 days.
