= Baltimore Transit Alliance =

The Baltimore Transit Alliance (BTA) was an initiative of the Greater Baltimore Committee, bringing together businesses and non-profit organizations to advocate for better public transportation in Baltimore, Maryland. The BTA's priorities included construction of the Red Line, a new east–west light rail line through Baltimore and the Green Line, an extension of the existing Baltimore Metro Subway; enhanced transit connections between Baltimore and Washington; improved local bus service in the Baltimore region; and regional cooperation among the local jurisdictions that comprise the region.

The BTA was formed in 2004, and is governed by a board of advisors that includes both business and non-profit representatives. Its first major success was to convince the Maryland Department of Transportation to provide funding for the planning and engineering phases of the Red Line, and to convince the region's Congressional delegation to authorize the project for federal funding. The BTA has also pressed the Maryland Transit Administration to keep the project on schedule and has acted as a liaison between MTA and community representatives.

In 2007, BTA's board voted to separate from the GBC and operate as a standalone organization under a new name, the Central Maryland Transportation Alliance, which was officially announced by Baltimore Mayor Sheila Dixon in October 2007.
