= List of Basic Trading Areas =

In the US, a Basic Trading Area is a geographic region defined originally in the Rand McNally Commercial Atlas and Marketing Guide and used by the FCC where a Personal Communications Service can operate. It consists of the counties surrounding a city designated as the basic trading center.

BTA #	Basic Trading Area	MTA #	Major Trading Area
1	Aberdeen, South Dakota	27	Minneapolis—St. Paul
2	Aberdeen, Washington	42	Seattle—Tacoma
3	Abilene, Texas	10	Dallas—Fort Worth
4	Ada, Oklahoma	31	Oklahoma City
5	Adrian, Michigan	13	Detroit
6	Albany—Tifton, Georgia	1	Atlanta
7	Albany—Schenectady, New York	30	New York
8	Albuquerque, New Mexico	14	El Paso—Albuquerque
9	Alexandria, Louisiana	29	New Orleans—Baton Rouge
10	Allentown—Bethlehem—Easton, Pennsylvania	30	New York
11	Alpena, Michigan	13	Detroit
12	Altoona, Pennsylvania	35	Pittsburgh
13	Amarillo, Texas	10	Dallas—Fort Worth
14	Anchorage, Alaska	42	Seattle—Tacoma
15	Anderson, Indiana	17	Indianapolis
16	Anderson, South Carolina	5	Charlotte—Greensboro—Greenville—Raleigh
17	Anniston, Alabama	2	Birmingham
18	Appleton—Oshkosh, Wisconsin	26	Milwaukee
19	Ardmore, Oklahoma	31	Oklahoma City
20	Asheville—Hendersonville, North Carolina	5	Charlotte—Greensboro—Greenville—Raleigh
21	Ashtabula, Ohio	8	Cleveland
22	Athens, Georgia	1	Atlanta
23	Athens, Ohio	9	Columbus
24	Atlanta, Georgia	1	Atlanta
25	Atlantic City, New Jersey	33	Philadelphia
26	Augusta, Georgia	1	Atlanta
27	Austin, Texas	10	Dallas—Fort Worth
28	Bakersfield, California	22	Los Angeles—San Diego
29	Baltimore, Maryland	46	Washington—Baltimore
30	Bangor, Maine	3	Boston—Providence
31	Bartlesville, Oklahoma	45	Tulsa
32	Baton Rouge, Louisiana	29	New Orleans—Baton Rouge
33	Battle Creek, Michigan	13	Detroit
34	Beaumont—Port Arthur, Texas	16	Houston
35	Beckley, West Virginia	7	Cincinnati—Dayton
36	Bellingham, Washington	42	Seattle—Tacoma
37	Bemidji, Minnesota	27	Minneapolis—St. Paul
38	Bend, Oregon	36	Portland
39	Benton Harbor, Michigan	6	Chicago
40	Big Spring, Texas	10	Dallas—Fort Worth
41	Billings, Montana	43	Spokane—Billings
42	Biloxi—Gulfport—Pascagoula, Mississippi	29	New Orleans—Baton Rouge
43	Binghamton, New York	30	New York
44	Birmingham, Alabama	2	Birmingham
45	Bismarck, North Dakota	27	Minneapolis—St. Paul
46	Bloomington, Illinois	6	Chicago
47	Bloomington—Bedford, Indiana	17	Indianapolis
48	Bluefield, West Virginia	7	Cincinnati—Dayton
49	Blytheville, Arkansas	24	Memphis—Jackson
50	Boise—Nampa, Idaho	39	Salt Lake City
51	Boston, Massachusetts	3	Boston—Providence
52	Bowling Green—Glasgow, Kentucky	23	Louisville—Lexington—Evansville
53	Bozeman, Montana	43	Spokane—Billings
54	Brainerd, Minnesota	27	Minneapolis—St. Paul
55	Bremerton, Washington	42	Seattle—Tacoma
56	Brownsville—Harlingen, Texas	40	San Antonio
57	Brownwood, Texas	10	Dallas—Fort Worth
58	Brunswick, Georgia	18	Jacksonville
59	Bryan—College Station, Texas	16	Houston
60	Buffalo—Niagara Falls, New York	4	Buffalo—Rochester
61	Burlington, Iowa	12	Des Moines—Quad Cities
62	Burlington, North Carolina	5	Charlotte—Greensboro—Greenville—Raleigh
63	Burlington, Vermont	30	New York
64	Butte, Montana	43	Spokane—Billings
65	Canton—New Philadelphia, Ohio	8	Cleveland
66	Cape Girardeau—Sikeston, Missouri	38	St. Louis
67	Carbondale—Marion, Illinois	38	St. Louis
68	Carlsbad, New Mexico	14	El Paso—Albuquerque
69	Casper—Gillette, Wyoming	11	Denver
70	Cedar Rapids, Iowa	12	Des Moines—Quad Cities
71	Champaign—Urbana, Illinois	6	Chicago
72	Charleston, South Carolina	5	Charlotte—Greensboro—Greenville—Raleigh
73	Charleston, West Virginia	7	Cincinnati—Dayton
74	Charlotte—Gastonia, North Carolina	5	Charlotte—Greensboro—Greenville—Raleigh
75	Charlottesville, Virginia	46	Washington—Baltimore
76	Chattanooga, Tennessee	1	Atlanta
77	Cheyenne, Wyoming	11	Denver
78	Chicago, Illinois	6	Chicago
79	Chico—Oroville, California	41	San Francisco—Oakland—San Jose
80	Chillicothe, Ohio	9	Columbus
81	Cincinnati, Ohio	7	Cincinnati—Dayton
82	Clarksburg—Elkins, West Virginia	35	Pittsburgh
83	Clarksville, Tennessee—Hopkinsville, Kentucky	28	Nashville
84	Cleveland—Akron, Ohio	8	Cleveland
85	Cleveland, Tennessee	1	Atlanta
86	Clinton, Iowa—Sterling, Illinois	12	Des Moines—Quad Cities
87	Clovis, New Mexico	10	Dallas—Fort Worth
88	Coffeyville, Kansas	45	Tulsa
89	Colorado Springs, Colorado	11	Denver
90	Columbia, Missouri	38	St. Louis
91	Columbia, South Carolina	5	Charlotte—Greensboro—Greenville—Raleigh
92	Columbus, Georgia	1	Atlanta
93	Columbus, Indiana	17	Indianapolis
94	Columbus—Starkville, Mississippi	24	Memphis—Jackson
95	Columbus, Ohio	9	Columbus
96	Cookeville, Tennessee	28	Nashville
97	Coos Bay—North Bend, Oregon	36	Portland
98	Corbin, Kentucky	23	Louisville—Lexington—Evansville
99	Corpus Christi, Texas	40	San Antonio
100	Cumberland, Maryland	46	Washington—Baltimore
101	Dallas—Fort Worth, Texas	10	Dallas—Fort Worth
102	Dalton, Georgia	1	Atlanta
103	Danville, Illinois	6	Chicago
104	Danville, Virginia	37	Richmond—Norfolk
105	Davenport, Iowa—Moline, Illinois	12	Des Moines—Quad Cities
106	Dayton—Springfield, Ohio	7	Cincinnati—Dayton
107	Daytona Beach, Florida	44	Tampa—St. Petersburg—Orlando
108	Decatur, Alabama	2	Birmingham
109	Decatur—Effingham, Illinois	6	Chicago
110	Denver, Colorado	11	Denver
111	Des Moines, Iowa	12	Des Moines—Quad Cities
112	Detroit, Michigan	13	Detroit
113	Dickinson, North Dakota	27	Minneapolis—St. Paul
114	Dodge City, Kansas	47	Wichita
115	Dothan—Enterprise, Alabama	2	Birmingham
116	Dover, Delaware	33	Philadelphia
117	Du Bois—Clearfield, Pennsylvania	35	Pittsburgh
118	Dubuque, Iowa	12	Des Moines—Quad Cities
119	Duluth, Minnesota	27	Minneapolis—St. Paul
120	Dyersburg—Union City, Tennessee	24	Memphis—Jackson
121	Eagle Pass—Del Rio, Texas	40	San Antonio
122	East Liverpool—Salem, Ohio	8	Cleveland
123	Eau Claire, Wisconsin	27	Minneapolis—St. Paul
124	El Centro—Calexico, California	22	Los Angeles—San Diego
125	El Dorado—Magnolia—Camden, Arkansas	21	Little Rock
126	Elkhart, Indiana	6	Chicago
127	Elmira—Corning—Hornell, New York	30	New York
128	El Paso, Texas	14	El Paso—Albuquerque
129	Emporia, Kansas	19	Kansas City
130	Enid, Oklahoma	31	Oklahoma City
131	Erie, Pennsylvania	8	Cleveland
132	Escanaba, Michigan	26	Milwaukee
133	Eugene—Springfield, Oregon	36	Portland
134	Eureka, California	41	San Francisco—Oakland—San Jose
135	Evansville, Indiana	23	Louisville—Lexington—Evansville
136	Fairbanks, Alaska	42	Seattle—Tacoma
137	Fairmont, West Virginia	35	Pittsburgh
138	Fargo, North Dakota	27	Minneapolis—St. Paul
139	Farmington, New Mexico—Durango, Colorado	14	El Paso—Albuquerque
140	Fayetteville—Springdale—Rogers, Arkansas	21	Little Rock
141	Fayetteville—Lumberton, North Carolina	5	Charlotte—Greensboro—Greenville—Raleigh
142	Fergus Falls, Minnesota	27	Minneapolis—St. Paul
143	Findlay—Tiffin, Ohio	13	Detroit
144	Flagstaff, Arizona	34	Phoenix
145	Flint, Michigan	13	Detroit
146	Florence, Alabama	2	Birmingham
147	Florence, South Carolina	5	Charlotte—Greensboro—Greenville—Raleigh
148	Fond du Lac, Wisconsin	26	Milwaukee
149	Fort Collins—Loveland, Colorado	11	Denver
150	Fort Dodge, Iowa	12	Des Moines—Quad Cities
151	Fort Myers, Florida	25	Miami—Fort Lauderdale
152	Fort Pierce—Vero Beach—Stuart, Florida	25	Miami—Fort Lauderdale
153	Fort Smith, Arkansas	21	Little Rock
154	Fort Walton Beach, Florida	29	New Orleans—Baton Rouge
155	Fort Wayne, Indiana	6	Chicago
156	Fredericksburg, Virginia	46	Washington—Baltimore
157	Fresno, California	41	San Francisco—Oakland—San Jose
158	Gadsden, Alabama	2	Birmingham
159	Gainesville, Florida	18	Jacksonville
160	Gainesville, Georgia	1	Atlanta
161	Galesburg, Illinois	6	Chicago
162	Gallup, New Mexico	14	El Paso—Albuquerque
163	Garden City, Kansas	47	Wichita
164	Glens Falls, New York	30	New York
165	Goldsboro—Kinston, North Carolina	5	Charlotte—Greensboro—Greenville—Raleigh
166	Grand Forks, North Dakota	27	Minneapolis—St. Paul
167	Grand Island—Kearney, Nebraska	32	Omaha
168	Grand Junction, Colorado	11	Denver
169	Grand Rapids, Michigan	13	Detroit
170	Great Bend, Kansas	47	Wichita
171	Great Falls, Montana	43	Spokane—Billings
172	Greeley, Colorado	11	Denver
173	Green Bay, Wisconsin	26	Milwaukee
174	Greensboro—Winston-Salem—High Point, North Carolina	5	Charlotte—Greensboro—Greenville—Raleigh
175	Greenville—Greenwood, Mississippi	24	Memphis—Jackson
176	Greenville—Washington, North Carolina	5	Charlotte—Greensboro—Greenville—Raleigh
177	Greenville—Spartanburg, South Carolina	5	Charlotte—Greensboro—Greenville—Raleigh
178	Greenwood, South Carolina	5	Charlotte—Greensboro—Greenville—Raleigh
179	Hagerstown, Maryland—Chambersburg, Pennsylvania—Martinsburg, West Virginia	46	Washington—Baltimore
180	Hammond, Louisiana	29	New Orleans—Baton Rouge
181	Harrisburg, Pennsylvania	33	Philadelphia
182	Harrison, Arkansas	21	Little Rock
183	Harrisonburg, Virginia	46	Washington—Baltimore
184	Hartford, Connecticut	30	New York
185	Hastings, Nebraska	32	Omaha
186	Hattiesburg, Mississippi	29	New Orleans—Baton Rouge
187	Hays, Kansas	47	Wichita
188	Helena, Montana	43	Spokane—Billings
189	Hickory—Lenoir—Morganton, North Carolina	5	Charlotte—Greensboro—Greenville—Raleigh
190	Hilo, Hawaii	15	Honolulu
191	Hobbs, New Mexico	10	Dallas—Fort Worth
192	Honolulu, Hawaii	15	Honolulu
193	Hot Springs, Arkansas	21	Little Rock
194	Houghton, Michigan	26	Milwaukee
195	Houma—Thibodaux, Louisiana	29	New Orleans—Baton Rouge
196	Houston, Texas	16	Houston
197	Huntington, West Virginia—Ashland, Kentucky	7	Cincinnati—Dayton
198	Huntsville, Alabama	2	Birmingham
199	Huron, South Dakota	27	Minneapolis—St. Paul
200	Hutchinson, Kansas	47	Wichita
201	Hyannis, Massachusetts	3	Boston—Providence
202	Idaho Falls, Idaho	39	Salt Lake City
203	Indiana, Pennsylvania	35	Pittsburgh
204	Indianapolis, Indiana	17	Indianapolis
205	Iowa City, Iowa	12	Des Moines—Quad Cities
206	Iron Mountain, Michigan	26	Milwaukee
207	Ironwood, Michigan	27	Minneapolis—St. Paul
208	Ithaca, New York	30	New York
209	Jackson, Michigan	13	Detroit
210	Jackson, Mississippi	24	Memphis—Jackson
211	Jackson, Tennessee	24	Memphis—Jackson
212	Jacksonville, Florida	18	Jacksonville
213	Jacksonville, Illinois	6	Chicago
214	Jacksonville, North Carolina	5	Charlotte—Greensboro—Greenville—Raleigh
215	Jamestown, New York—Warren, Pennsylvania—Dunkirk, New York	4	Buffalo—Rochester
216	Janesville—Beloit, Wisconsin	26	Milwaukee
217	Jefferson City, Missouri	38	St. Louis
218	Johnstown, Pennsylvania	35	Pittsburgh
219	Jonesboro—Paragould, Arkansas	21	Little Rock
220	Joplin, Missouri—Miami, Oklahoma	19	Kansas City
221	Juneau—Ketchikan, Alaska	42	Seattle—Tacoma
222	Kahului—Wailuku—Lahaina, Hawaii	15	Honolulu
223	Kalamazoo, Michigan	13	Detroit
224	Kalispell, Montana	43	Spokane—Billings
225	Kankakee, Illinois	6	Chicago
226	Kansas City, Missouri	19	Kansas City
227	Keene, New Hampshire	3	Boston—Providence
228	Kennewick—Pasco—Richland, Washington	43	Spokane—Billings
229	Kingsport, Tennessee—Johnson City, Tennessee—Bristol, Virginia-Tennessee	20	Knoxville
230	Kirksville, Missouri	38	St. Louis
231	Klamath Falls, Oregon	36	Portland
232	Knoxville, Tennessee	20	Knoxville
233	Kokomo—Logansport, Indiana	17	Indianapolis
234	La Crosse, Wisconsin—Winona, Minnesota	26	Milwaukee
235	Lafayette, Indiana	17	Indianapolis
236	Lafayette—New Iberia, Louisiana	29	New Orleans—Baton Rouge
237	La Grange, Georgia	1	Atlanta
238	Lake Charles, Louisiana	16	Houston
239	Lakeland—Winter Haven, Florida	44	Tampa—St. Petersburg—Orlando
240	Lancaster, Pennsylvania	33	Philadelphia
241	Lansing, Michigan	13	Detroit
242	Laredo, Texas	40	San Antonio
243	La Salle—Peru—Ottawa—Streator, Illinois	6	Chicago
244	Las Cruces, New Mexico	14	El Paso—Albuquerque
245	Las Vegas, Nevada	22	Los Angeles—San Diego
246	Laurel, Mississippi	29	New Orleans—Baton Rouge
247	Lawrence, Kansas	19	Kansas City
248	Lawton—Duncan, Oklahoma	31	Oklahoma City
249	Lebanon—Claremont, New Hampshire	3	Boston—Providence
250	Lewiston—Moscow, Idaho	43	Spokane—Billings
251	Lewiston—Auburn, Maine	3	Boston—Providence
252	Lexington, Kentucky	23	Louisville—Lexington—Evansville
253	Liberal, Kansas	47	Wichita
254	Lihue, Hawaii	15	Honolulu
255	Lima, Ohio	13	Detroit
256	Lincoln, Nebraska	32	Omaha
257	Little Rock, Arkansas	21	Little Rock
258	Logan, Utah	39	Salt Lake City
259	Logan, West Virginia	7	Cincinnati—Dayton
260	Longview—Marshall, Texas	10	Dallas—Fort Worth
261	Longview, Washington	36	Portland
262	Los Angeles, California	22	Los Angeles—San Diego
263	Louisville, Kentucky	23	Louisville—Lexington—Evansville
264	Lubbock, Texas	10	Dallas—Fort Worth
265	Lufkin—Nacogdoches, Texas	16	Houston
266	Lynchburg, Virginia	37	Richmond—Norfolk
267	McAlester, Oklahoma	31	Oklahoma City
268	McAllen, Texas	40	San Antonio
269	McComb—Brookhaven, Mississippi	29	New Orleans—Baton Rouge
270	McCook, Nebraska	32	Omaha
271	Macon—Warner Robins, Georgia	1	Atlanta
272	Madison, Wisconsin	26	Milwaukee
273	Madisonville, Kentucky	23	Louisville—Lexington—Evansville
274	Manchester—Nashua—Concord, New Hampshire	3	Boston—Providence
275	Manhattan—Junction City, Kansas	19	Kansas City
276	Manitowoc, Wisconsin	26	Milwaukee
277	Mankato—Fairmont, Minnesota	27	Minneapolis—St. Paul
278	Mansfield, Ohio	8	Cleveland
279	Marinette, Wisconsin—Menominee, Michigan	26	Milwaukee
280	Marion, Indiana	17	Indianapolis
281	Marion, Ohio	9	Columbus
282	Marquette, Michigan	26	Milwaukee
283	Marshalltown, Iowa	12	Des Moines—Quad Cities
284	Martinsville, Virginia	37	Richmond—Norfolk
285	Mason City, Iowa	12	Des Moines—Quad Cities
286	Mattoon, Illinois	6	Chicago
287	Meadville, Pennsylvania	8	Cleveland
288	Medford—Grants Pass, Oregon	36	Portland
289	Melbourne—Titusville, Florida	44	Tampa—St. Petersburg—Orlando
290	Memphis, Tennessee	24	Memphis—Jackson
291	Merced, California	41	San Francisco—Oakland—San Jose
292	Meridian, Mississippi	24	Memphis—Jackson
293	Miami—Fort Lauderdale, Florida	25	Miami—Fort Lauderdale
294	Michigan City—La Porte, Indiana	6	Chicago
295	Middlesboro—Harlan, Kentucky	20	Knoxville
296	Midland, Texas	10	Dallas—Fort Worth
297	Milwaukee, Wisconsin	26	Milwaukee
298	Minneapolis—St. Paul, Minnesota	27	Minneapolis—St. Paul
299	Minot, North Dakota	27	Minneapolis—St. Paul
300	Missoula, Montana	43	Spokane—Billings
301	Mitchell, South Dakota	27	Minneapolis—St. Paul
302	Mobile, Alabama	29	New Orleans—Baton Rouge
303	Modesto, California	41	San Francisco—Oakland—San Jose
304	Monroe, Louisiana	10	Dallas—Fort Worth
305	Montgomery, Alabama	2	Birmingham
306	Morgantown, West Virginia	35	Pittsburgh
307	Mount Pleasant, Michigan	13	Detroit
308	Mount Vernon—Centralia, Illinois	38	St. Louis
309	Muncie, Indiana	17	Indianapolis
310	Muskegon, Michigan	13	Detroit
311	Muskogee, Oklahoma	45	Tulsa
312	Myrtle Beach, South Carolina	5	Charlotte—Greensboro—Greenville—Raleigh
313	Naples, Florida	25	Miami—Fort Lauderdale
314	Nashville, Tennessee	28	Nashville
315	Natchez, Mississippi	24	Memphis—Jackson
316	New Bern, North Carolina	5	Charlotte—Greensboro—Greenville—Raleigh
317	New Castle, Pennsylvania	35	Pittsburgh
318	New Haven—Waterbury—Meriden, Connecticut	30	New York
319	New London—Norwich, Connecticut	30	New York
320	New Orleans, Louisiana	29	New Orleans—Baton Rouge
321	New York, New York	30	New York
322	Nogales, Arizona	34	Phoenix
323	Norfolk, Nebraska	32	Omaha
324	Norfolk—Virginia Beach—Newport News—Hampton, Virginia	37	Richmond—Norfolk
325	North Platte, Nebraska	32	Omaha
326	Ocala, Florida	44	Tampa—St. Petersburg—Orlando
327	Odessa, Texas	10	Dallas—Fort Worth
328	Oil City—Franklin, Pennsylvania	35	Pittsburgh
329	Oklahoma City, Oklahoma	31	Oklahoma City
330	Olean, New York—Bradford, Pennsylvania	4	Buffalo—Rochester
331	Olympia—Centralia, Washington	42	Seattle—Tacoma
332	Omaha, Nebraska	32	Omaha
333	Oneonta, New York	30	New York
334	Opelika—Auburn, Alabama	1	Atlanta
335	Orangeburg, South Carolina	5	Charlotte—Greensboro—Greenville—Raleigh
336	Orlando, Florida	44	Tampa—St. Petersburg—Orlando
337	Ottumwa, Iowa	12	Des Moines—Quad Cities
338	Owensboro, Kentucky	23	Louisville—Lexington—Evansville
339	Paducah—Murray—Mayfield, Kentucky	23	Louisville—Lexington—Evansville
340	Panama City, Florida	18	Jacksonville
341	Paris, Texas	10	Dallas—Fort Worth
342	Parkersburg, West Virginia—Marietta, Ohio	9	Columbus
343	Pensacola, Florida	29	New Orleans—Baton Rouge
344	Peoria, Illinois	6	Chicago
345	Petoskey, Michigan	13	Detroit
346	Philadelphia, Pennsylvania—Wilmington, Delaware—Trenton, New Jersey	33	Philadelphia
347	Phoenix, Arizona	34	Phoenix
348	Pine Bluff, Arkansas	21	Little Rock
349	Pittsburg—Parsons, Kansas	19	Kansas City
350	Pittsburgh, Pennsylvania	35	Pittsburgh
351	Pittsfield, Massachusetts	3	Boston—Providence
352	Plattsburgh, New York	30	New York
353	Pocatello, Idaho	39	Salt Lake City
354	Ponca City, Oklahoma	31	Oklahoma City
355	Poplar Bluff, Missouri	38	St. Louis
356	Port Angeles, Washington	42	Seattle—Tacoma
357	Portland—Brunswick, Maine	3	Boston—Providence
358	Portland, Oregon	36	Portland
359	Portsmouth, Ohio	7	Cincinnati—Dayton
360	Pottsville, Pennsylvania	33	Philadelphia
361	Poughkeepsie—Kingston, New York	30	New York
362	Prescott, Arizona	34	Phoenix
363	Presque Isle, Maine	3	Boston—Providence
364	Providence—Pawtucket, Rhode Island—New Bedford—Fall River, Massachusetts	3	Boston—Providence
365	Provo—Orem, Utah	39	Salt Lake City
366	Pueblo, Colorado	11	Denver
367	Quincy, Illinois—Hannibal, Missouri	38	St. Louis
368	Raleigh—Durham, North Carolina	5	Charlotte—Greensboro—Greenville—Raleigh
369	Rapid City, South Dakota	11	Denver
370	Reading, Pennsylvania	33	Philadelphia
371	Redding, California	41	San Francisco—Oakland—San Jose
372	Reno, Nevada	41	San Francisco—Oakland—San Jose
373	Richmond, Indiana	17	Indianapolis
374	Richmond—Petersburg, Virginia	37	Richmond—Norfolk
375	Riverton, Wyoming	11	Denver
376	Roanoke, Virginia	37	Richmond—Norfolk
377	Roanoke Rapids, North Carolina	5	Charlotte—Greensboro—Greenville—Raleigh
378	Rochester—Austin—Albert Lea, Minnesota	27	Minneapolis—St. Paul
379	Rochester, New York	4	Buffalo—Rochester
380	Rockford, Illinois	6	Chicago
381	Rock Springs, Wyoming	11	Denver
382	Rocky Mount—Wilson, North Carolina	5	Charlotte—Greensboro—Greenville—Raleigh
383	Rolla, Missouri	38	St. Louis
384	Rome, Georgia	1	Atlanta
385	Roseburg, Oregon	36	Portland
386	Roswell, New Mexico	14	El Paso—Albuquerque
387	Russellville, Arkansas	21	Little Rock
388	Rutland—Bennington, Vermont	30	New York
389	Sacramento, California	41	San Francisco—Oakland—San Jose
390	Saginaw—Bay City, Michigan	13	Detroit
391	St. Cloud, Minnesota	27	Minneapolis—St. Paul
392	St. George, Utah	39	Salt Lake City
393	St. Joseph, Missouri	19	Kansas City
394	St. Louis, Missouri	38	St. Louis
395	Salem—Albany—Corvallis, Oregon	36	Portland
396	Salina, Kansas	47	Wichita
397	Salinas—Monterey, California	41	San Francisco—Oakland—San Jose
398	Salisbury, Maryland	46	Washington—Baltimore
399	Salt Lake City—Ogden, Utah	39	Salt Lake City
400	San Angelo, Texas	10	Dallas—Fort Worth
401	San Antonio, Texas	40	San Antonio
402	San Diego, California	22	Los Angeles—San Diego
403	Sandusky, Ohio	8	Cleveland
404	San Francisco—Oakland—San Jose, California	41	San Francisco—Oakland—San Jose
405	San Luis Obispo, California	22	Los Angeles—San Diego
406	Santa Barbara—Santa Maria, California	22	Los Angeles—San Diego
407	Santa Fe, New Mexico	14	El Paso—Albuquerque
408	Sarasota—Bradenton, Florida	44	Tampa—St. Petersburg—Orlando
409	Sault Ste. Marie, Michigan	13	Detroit
410	Savannah, Georgia	1	Atlanta
411	Scottsbluff, Nebraska	11	Denver
412	Scranton—Wilkes-Barre—Hazleton, Pennsylvania	30	New York
413	Seattle—Tacoma, Washington	42	Seattle—Tacoma
414	Sedalia, Missouri	19	Kansas City
415	Selma, Alabama	2	Birmingham
416	Sharon, Pennsylvania	8	Cleveland
417	Sheboygan, Wisconsin	26	Milwaukee
418	Sherman—Denison, Texas	10	Dallas—Fort Worth
419	Shreveport, Louisiana	10	Dallas—Fort Worth
420	Sierra Vista—Douglas, Arizona	34	Phoenix
421	Sioux City, Iowa	12	Des Moines—Quad Cities
422	Sioux Falls, South Dakota	27	Minneapolis—St. Paul
423	Somerset, Kentucky	23	Louisville—Lexington—Evansville
424	South Bend—Mishawaka, Indiana	6	Chicago
425	Spokane, Washington	43	Spokane—Billings
426	Springfield, Illinois	6	Chicago
427	Springfield—Holyoke, Massachusetts	3	Boston—Providence
428	Springfield, Missouri	38	St. Louis
429	State College, Pennsylvania	33	Philadelphia
430	Staunton—Waynesboro, Virginia	37	Richmond—Norfolk
431	Steubenville, Ohio—Weirton, West Virginia	35	Pittsburgh
432	Stevens Point—Marshfield—Wisconsin Rapids, Wisconsin	26	Milwaukee
433	Stillwater, Oklahoma	31	Oklahoma City
434	Stockton, California	41	San Francisco—Oakland—San Jose
435	Stroudsburg, Pennsylvania	30	New York
436	Sumter, South Carolina	5	Charlotte—Greensboro—Greenville—Raleigh
437	Sunbury—Shamokin, Pennsylvania	33	Philadelphia
438	Syracuse, New York	30	New York
439	Tallahassee, Florida	18	Jacksonville
440	Tampa—St. Petersburg—Clearwater, Florida	44	Tampa—St. Petersburg—Orlando
441	Temple—Killeen, Texas	10	Dallas—Fort Worth
442	Terre Haute, Indiana	17	Indianapolis
443	Texarkana, Texas-Arkansas	10	Dallas—Fort Worth
444	Toledo, Ohio	13	Detroit
445	Topeka, Kansas	19	Kansas City
446	Traverse City, Michigan	13	Detroit
447	Tucson, Arizona	34	Phoenix
448	Tulsa, Oklahoma	45	Tulsa
449	Tupelo—Corinth, Mississippi	24	Memphis—Jackson
450	Tuscaloosa, Alabama	2	Birmingham
451	Twin Falls, Idaho	39	Salt Lake City
452	Tyler, Texas	10	Dallas—Fort Worth
453	Utica—Rome, New York	30	New York
454	Valdosta, Georgia	18	Jacksonville
455	Vicksburg, Mississippi	24	Memphis—Jackson
456	Victoria, Texas	16	Houston
457	Vincennes—Washington, Indiana	17	Indianapolis
458	Visalia—Porterville—Hanford, California	41	San Francisco—Oakland—San Jose
459	Waco, Texas	10	Dallas—Fort Worth
460	Walla Walla, Washington—Pendleton, Oregon	43	Spokane—Billings
461	Washington, DC	46	Washington—Baltimore
462	Waterloo—Cedar Falls, Iowa	12	Des Moines—Quad Cities
463	Watertown, New York	30	New York
464	Watertown, South Dakota	27	Minneapolis—St. Paul
465	Waterville—Augusta, Maine	3	Boston—Providence
466	Wausau—Rhinelander, Wisconsin	26	Milwaukee
467	Waycross, Georgia	18	Jacksonville
468	Wenatchee, Washington	42	Seattle—Tacoma
469	West Palm Beach—Boca Raton, Florida	25	Miami—Fort Lauderdale
470	West Plains, Missouri	38	St. Louis
471	Wheeling, West Virginia	35	Pittsburgh
472	Wichita, Kansas	47	Wichita
473	Wichita Falls, Texas	10	Dallas—Fort Worth
474	Williamson, West Virginia—Pikeville, Kentucky	7	Cincinnati—Dayton
475	Williamsport, Pennsylvania	33	Philadelphia
476	Williston, North Dakota	27	Minneapolis—St. Paul
477	Willmar—Marshall, Minnesota	27	Minneapolis—St. Paul
478	Wilmington, North Carolina	5	Charlotte—Greensboro—Greenville—Raleigh
479	Winchester, Virginia	46	Washington—Baltimore
480	Worcester—Fitchburg—Leominster, Massachusetts	3	Boston—Providence
481	Worthington, Minnesota	27	Minneapolis—St. Paul
482	Yakima, Washington	42	Seattle—Tacoma
483	York—Hanover, Pennsylvania	33	Philadelphia
484	Youngstown—Warren, Ohio	8	Cleveland
485	Yuba City—Marysville, California	41	San Francisco—Oakland—San Jose
486	Yuma, Arizona	34	Phoenix
487	Zanesville—Cambridge, Ohio	9	Columbus

- Note: The Major Trading Area (MTA) numbers in this table are based on alphabetical sorting, rather than population.
