= Mark Hyman (doctor) =

American physician and author (born 1959)

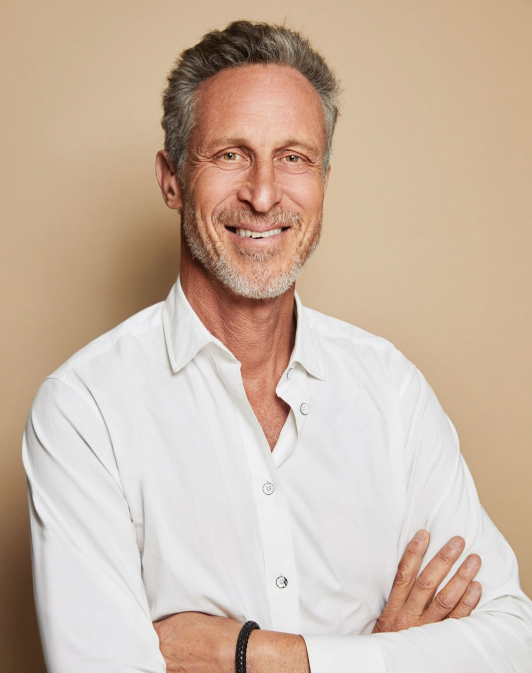
- Born: Mark Adam Hyman; November 22, 1959 (age 67)
- Education: University of Ottawa
- Occupations: Physician, author
- Known for: Functional medicine advocacy, pegan diet
- Mother: Ruth Sidransky
- Website: drhyman.com

Mark Adam Hyman (born November 22, 1959) is an American physician and author. He is the founder and medical director of The UltraWellness Center. Hyman was a regular contributor to the Katie Couric Show until the show's cancellation in 2013. He hosts an eponymous podcast, The Dr. Hyman Show, which examines many topics related to human health. He is the author of several books on nutrition and longevity, of which 15 have become New York Times bestsellers, including Food Fix, Eat Fat, Get Thin, and Young Forever.

Hyman is a proponent of the pseudoscientific functional medicine, a form of alternative medicine. He is the board president of clinical affairs of the Institute for Functional Medicine and is the founder of and senior adviser to the Center for Functional Medicine at the Cleveland Clinic. Hyman promotes the pegan diet, which has been characterized as a fad diet.

== Early life ==
Hyman was born in New York to Ruth Sidransky. He is Jewish. He graduated from Cornell University with a bachelor's degree in Asian Studies. He received his Doctor of Medicine degree from the University of Ottawa and completed his training at the Community Hospital of Santa Rosa in family medicine.

== Career ==
=== Early career ===
Hyman started his medical career as a family physician in rural Idaho and later as an emergency department physician in Massachusetts. He was the co-medical director at Canyon Ranch in Lenox, Massachusetts, from 1996 to 2004. He opened The UltraWellness Center in Lenox after leaving Canyon Ranch.

Hyman is one of the most prominent proponents of functional medicine, a controversial form of alternative medicine; there is no definitive clinical evidence of its effectiveness. He is a contributing editor to the journal Alternative Therapies in Health and Medicine and was editor-in-chief until 2008.

In 2009, Hyman testified before the United States Senate Committee on Health, Education, Labor, and Pensions about integrative medical care. That same year, he won the Linus Pauling award from the Institute for Functional Medicine.

=== 2010-2020 ===
Hyman participated in a Partners In Health program to bring medical care to Haiti following the 2010 Haiti earthquake. In 2011, Hyman presented at The Nantucket Project on the root causes of disease.

In December 2013, The Daniel Plan, a book Hyman co-authored with Pastor Rick Warren and Daniel Amen, became number one on the New York Times Best Seller list and was awarded Christian Book of the Year in 2013. Hyman is the author of several books on nutrition and health, such as 10 Day Detox Diet. In 2014, Hyman founded Center for Functional Medicine at the Cleveland Clinic. He appeared as a featured expert in the 2014 documentary film Fed Up. He was previously an unpaid contributing blogger for The Huffington Post through their contributors program. The same year, Hyman spoke at the World Economic Forum in Davos.

He collaborated with Kennedy's 2014 book Thimerosal: Let the Science Speak, writing the preface in which he advocates for the removal of thimerosal from vaccines as a precautionary measure. Hyman convinced Kennedy to remove controversial chapters incorrectly linking thimerosal to autism. In 2016, Hyman joined environmentalists and civil rights leaders in calling for federal investigations into U.S. fluoridation policy, writing that communities of color are at particular risk of adverse health impacts. In an episode of The Diary of a CEO podcast, Hyman claimed that autism could be caused by eating gluten or by childhood vaccines, contrary to widely accepted scientific evidence.

A 2014 New York Times article described Hyman's relationship as a medical adviser to Bill and Hillary Clinton.

Quackwatch lists Hyman's 2003 book Ultraprevention: The 6-Week Plan That Will Make You Healthy for Life as one of their non-recommended books due to promoting misinformation and containing unsubstantiated advice.

In 2020, Hyman founded Food Fix Campaign, a nonprofit organization addressing the food system's impact on health and the environment through policy change. Hyman was director of the Center for Functional Medicine at the Cleveland Clinic until some point in 2023, when cardiologist Dr. James E. Carter stepped into the position.

=== 2021-present ===
In 2021, Hyman co-founded Function Health, a membership-based diagnostic health platform company that offers direct-to-consumer lab tests, including ones for organ health, hormone, nutrient, metabolic and cancer signal tests. Hyman co-founded the company to deal with "an overburdened health system" that he claimed led to increases in chronic illness and misdiagnoses, and that the company "removed barriers around extensive lab testing."

Since its founding in 2021, Hyman has acted as the chief medical officer of the company. As of 2023, Function Health has completed more than 3 million lab tests; as of 2024, the company had at least 100,000 members. The company has raised $53 million in seed and series A fundraising rounds from Andreessen Horowitz, Wisdom.vc, Draft Ventures, K5 and G9 Ventures, among others. The company partnered with health club Equinox Group to offer a personalized nutrition, sleep, and fitness coaching program.

Hyman's frequent promotion of medical pseudoscience attracted sharp criticism from medical professionals and science communicators such as Hariett Hall, David Gorski, Wallace Sampson and Jonathan Jarry, pointing to his embrace of functional medicine, his rejection of germ theory and his business model based on a massive number of tests to sell unproven supplements. His close association with Robert F. Kennedy Jr. and appointment as a CBS News contributor by Bari Weiss in January 2026 amounted for Jarry as "the institutionalization of pseudoscience".

In June 2024, Hyman launched a podcast called "Health Hacks." That same month, he signed with talent agency WME, also known as Endeavor. In September 2024, Hyman testified before the House Ways and Means health subcommittee about the root causes of disease. In October 2024, Thrive Global partnered with Hyman's Function Health to improve employee health, according to Thrive founder Arianna Huffington. That month, Function Health also partnered with Grail to provide to early cancer detection tests.

As of January 2025, he is the board president of clinical affairs of the Institute for Functional Medicine. In May 2025 Hyman was named to the Time 100 Health list. That month, Function Health acquired Magnetic resonance imaging scanning company Ezra.

== Pegan diet ==
Hyman endorsed a low-carbohydrate high-fat diet in his books Eat Fat Get Thin and The Eat Fat, Get Thin Cookbook, published in 2016. In these books, Hyman disputes commonly held ideas about consuming dietary fat. He says that saturated fat does not cause heart disease and obesity; processed carbohydrates do. Hyman recommends his readers transition to a pegan diet.

Hyman promoted the pegan diet, a plant-rich diet that combines principles of the paleo and vegan diets. The pegan diet is gluten-free and encourages consumption of nonstarchy vegetables with grass-fed organic meats and low-mercury fish. The diet consists of 75% plant foods and limits fruits to low-glycemic berries. The pegan diet opposes refined sugar and foods that can spike insulin production. The diet also opposes cow's milk but is not dairy free. Hyman allows the occasional organic goat or sheep milk, yogurt, kefir, grass-fed butter, ghee or cheese. Hyman has stated that the pegan diet can be defined by one simple rule: "If God made it, eat it; if man made it, leave it."

Hyman first wrote about the pegan diet in 2014 and outlined it in his book Food: What the Heck Should I Eat?, published in 2018.

=== Reception ===
The pegan diet has been termed by some dietitians as a fad diet. The diet's emphasis on vegetables and omega-3 fats is in accord to mainstream nutrition advice but has been criticized for limiting the consumption of beans and whole grains, which are associated with multiple health benefits such as reducing cardiovascular disease and cancer risk and supporting weight management. The pegan diet has been called restrictive and it has been suggested that it may cause magnesium, iron or calcium deficiency.

A review in Publishers Weekly commented that "Pegan is a silly, paradoxical misnomer: no diet can be simultaneously paleo (meat, fats, and few vegetables/fruit) and vegan (with no animal products whatsoever). However, the diet’s recommendations are basically sound: fresh, locally sourced, preferably organic food; nothing refined or processed; and a focus on not raising blood sugar."

Dietitian Carrie Dennett has written that "while the pegan diet is more moderate - and potentially easier to follow - than either of its dietary parents, it does restrict many nutritious foods for reasons that aren't quite supported by science." A downside to the diet is that it can be costly for those with low incomes who cannot afford the expensive "grass-fed" and "pasture-raised" animal source foods that Hyman recommends. Aisling Pigott, a dietitian and spokesperson for the British Dietetic Association, has suggested that the pegan diet is too restrictive to maintain and although some of its principles such as eating more plant-based foods and fewer processed foods are recommended for good health, "labeling this as a 'diet' is unethical and potentially dangerous and difficult to follow."

Dietitian Alyssa Pike has disputed Hyman's claim that gluten should be avoided by people without a gluten allergy or intolerance and concluded that "the concept of this diet, combined with its number of restrictive rules, will likely make it hard to follow long-term and add to confusion about what to eat and why."

Oncologist Adil Akhtar has commented that "the pegan diet has taken good things from the vegan diet and attached it to some of the good things from the paleo diet. Both of them emphasize eating whole, natural foods, and avoiding eating anything processed or anything artificial. If you look at the pegan diet, it's about 75% vegan. The only difference is the source of protein in the vegan diet. Vegans get protein from beans and legumes. On the pegan diet, you're allowed to tap into grass-fed, healthy animal meat". Akhtar has noted that the pegan diet "looks quite close to the Mediterranean diet" and may be helpful to those who want to reduce their risk of developing cancer.

== Publications ==
- — (2005). Ultraprevention: The 6-Week Plan that Will Make You Healthy for Life. New York: Atria Books. ISBN 978-0-7434-4883-3. OCLC 57448242.
- — (2007). The Ultrametabolism Cookbook: 200 Delicious Recipes that Will Turn on Your Fat-Burning DNA. New York: Scribner. ISBN 978-1-4165-4959-8. OCLC 156902321.
- — (2008). The UltraMind Solution: Fix Your Broken Brain by Healing Your Body First: The Simple Way to Defeat Depression, Overcome Anxiety and Sharpen Your Mind. New York: Scribner. ISBN 978-1-4165-4971-0. OCLC 297439691.
- — (2008). Ultrametabolism: The Simple Plan for Automatic Weight Loss: Awakening the Fat-Burning DNA Hidden in Your Body. New York: Atria Books. ISBN 978-0-7432-7256-8. OCLC 213354732.
- — (2009). The Ultrasimple Diet: Kick-Start Your Metabolism and Safely Lose Up to 10 Pounds in 7 Days. New York: Pocket Books. ISBN 978-1-4391-7131-8. OCLC 351316362.
- — (2012). The Blood Sugar Solution: The Ultrahealthy Program for Losing Weight, Preventing Disease, and Feeling Great Now. New York, NY: Little, Brown and Co. ISBN 978-0-316-12737-0. OCLC 639167583.
- — (February 26, 2013). The Blood Sugar Solution Cookbook: More Than 175 Ultra-Tasty Recipes for Total Health and Weight Loss. Little, Brown. ISBN 9780316248174.
- — (2014). The Blood Sugar Solution 10-Day Detox Diet: Activate Your Body's Natural Ability to Burn Fat and Lose Weight Fast. New York, NY: Little, Brown and Company. ISBN 978-0-316-23002-5. OCLC 843858725.
- — (2015). The Blood Sugar Solution 10-Day Detox Diet Cookbook: More Than 150 Recipes to Help You Lose Weight and Stay Healthy for Life. Little, Brown. ISBN 9780316338806.
- — (2016). Eat Fat, Get Thin: Why the Fat We Eat is the Key to Sustained Weight Loss and Vibrant Health. New York: Little, Brown and Company. ISBN 978-0-316-33883-7. OCLC 911070119.
- — (2017). The Eat Fat, Get Thin Cookbook: More Than 175 Delicious Recipes for Sustained Weight Loss and Vibrant Health. Little, Brown. ISBN 9780316317498.
- — (2018). Food: What the Heck Should I Eat? The No-nonsense Guide to Achieving Optimal Weight and Lifelong Health. New York: Little, Brown and Company. ISBN 978-0-316-33886-8.
- — (2019). Food: What the Heck Should I Cook?. New York: Little, Brown and Company. ISBN 978-0-316-45313-4.
- — (2020). Food Fix: How to Save our Health, Our Economy, Our Communities, and Our Planet - One Bite at a Time. New York: Little, Brown and Company. ISBN 978-0-316-45317-2. OCLC 1105151559.
- — (2023). Young Forever. New York: Little, Brown and Company. ISBN 978-0316453189.
- — (2024). The Young Forever Cookbook. New York: Little, Brown Spark. ISBN 978-0316571623.
