= Function Health =

American health technology company

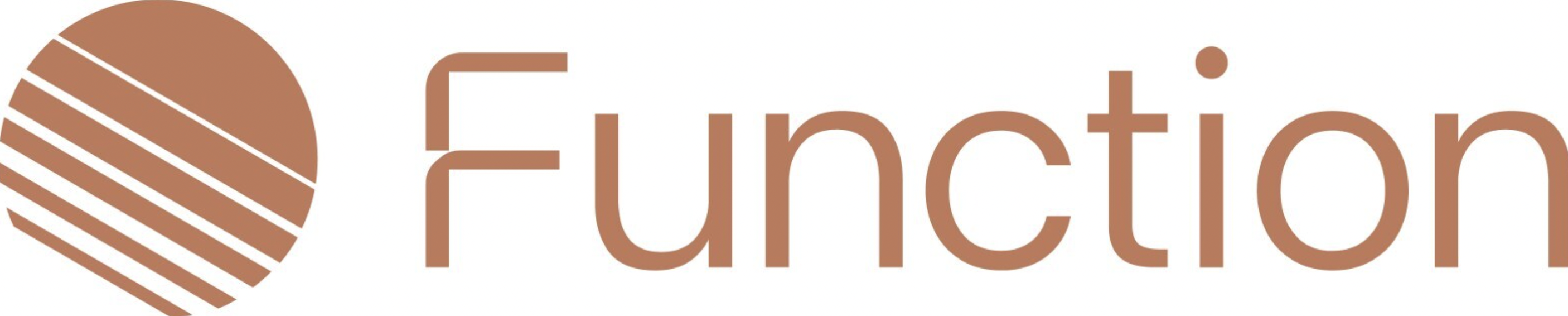
- Type: Private
- Founded: 2021
- Founder: Mark Hyman; Jonathan Swerdlin; Daniel Swerdlin; Pranitha Patil; Mike Nemke; Seth Weisfeld
- Headquarters: Austin, Texas
- Number of employees: 50
- Website: functionhealth.com

Function Health, often stylized as simply Function, is an American company and platform headquartered in Austin, Texas. The venture capital-backed company offers blood testing services. The company was co-founded by Mark Hyman, Pranitha Patil, Mike Nemke, Seth Weisfeld, Jonathan Swerdlin and Daniel Swerdlin.

The company offers a membership-based health platform with direct-to-consumer blood testing, urine testing (21 tests), for a total of 160 tests, along with AI-generated reports and cross-promotion of supplements, with an option of adding full-body MRI and CT scans. The company was valued at $2.5 billion in its last financing round in November 2025.

== History ==
Function Health was founded in 2021 by Mark Hyman, Pranitha Patil, Mike Nemke, Seth Weisfeld, Jonathan Swerdlin and Daniel Swerdlin.

According to co-founder Mike Nemke, he connected with Pranitha Patil in 2021 after seeing her online post seeking a technical co-founder, then met Jonathan Swerdlin and began collaborating with the team.

In 2023, Function Health completed more than three million lab tests. As of 2024, the company had at least 100,000 members and a waitlist of 200,000. That same year, Hyman stated there were over a million data points on Function Health’s first group of 10,000 people.

In May 2025, Function Health acquired Ezra (founded by Emi Gal) and planned to add Ezra's MRI scanning technology to its platform.

In 2025, Function Health was one of the offerings included in the Academy Awards nominees gift bag. That same year, the company launched a brand campaign for Mother's Day, called "Long Live Moms."

In June 2025, Function Health was named to Time's most influential companies of 2025 list. In April 2026, the company acquired Getlabs, a mobile healthcare company that provides at-home diagnostic health testing. In May 2026, Function Health acquired SuppCo, a platform that rates and tests dietary supplements.

== Technology ==
According to its website, Function Health is not a laboratory or medical provider. All consumers are sent to Quest Diagnostics locations for blood draws, and Quest Diagnostics is the laboratory that performs all tests. All laboratory and medical services are provided by independent third parties. Function Health also states that it does not offer medical advice, diagnosis, or medical treatment.

Function Health operates as a middleman between consumers and existing laboratory services. The company negotiates discounted prices, facilitates test ordering, and presents results through its platform, but the actual specimen collection, laboratory analysis, and clinical interpretation are performed by other entities. Consumers pay Function Health a fixed membership fee to coordinate discounted services from its network of third party providers; one third party estimated that the labs included in $365 membership would cost $1,114 if purchased individually. This business model differs from vertically integrated laboratory services where a single company performs specimen collection, testing, and result delivery.

=== Artificial Intelligence ===
In November 2025, Function Health launched a generative large-language model (LLM) AI chatbot called "Medical Intelligence Lab." The chatbot was developed to provide personalized responses based on user data, wearables, lab results, doctor's notes and scans, and was developed under HIPAA standards.

In January 2026, the company partnered with artificial intelligence company OpenAI on its launch of ChatGPT Health, a tab on OpenAI's chatbot focused on healthcare questions. ChatGPT Health connected to health platforms and apps, like Function Health, Apple Health (via iOS), MyFitnessPal, Weightwatchers, AllTrails, Peloton and Instacart. That same month, Function Health created a connector for Anthropic's chatbot Claude that allowed users to receive results personalized based on the LLM's access to their health data and lab results via the Function Health app. In March 2026, the company announced integrations with chatbots Perplexity AI and Microsoft Copilot.

== Fundraising ==
Since its founding, the company conducted three seed rounds. In March 2022, the company raised $3 million, with additional rounds in December 2023, and April 2024, although the amount raised during these rounds was unreported.

In June 2024, the company was valued at $191 million following its series A fundraising round of $53 million from Andreessen Horowitz, Wisdom.vc, Draft Ventures, K5 and G9 Ventures, among others.

Function Health has received investment from institutions like 53 Stations and Embiid Ventures, as well as individual businesspeople, investors and doctors, including Ari Emanuel, Casey Means, Harvey Spevak, former Oura CEO Harpreet Singh Rai, and Jeff Dean. The company also has received investment from actors and influencers like Matt Damon, Kevin Hart, Zac Efron, Pedro Pascal and Jay Shetty, and sports figures including Blake Griffin, Colin Kaepernick and Jimmy Rollins.

In November 2025, Function Health announced a $298 million Series B financing at a $2.5 billion valuation, led by Redpoint Ventures. In July 2026, Function announced $450 million in additional funding from General Catalyst.

== Partnerships ==
In May 2024, the company partnered with health club Equinox Group to offer a personalized nutrition, sleep and fitness coaching program, which included lab testing from Function Health. The program was developed to help members measure physical and mental performance in relation to their fitness goals. In October 2024, the company partnered with Thrive Global, a health technology company founded by Arianna Huffington. The partnership offered a health coaching program to employees.

In December 2024, the company announced its partnership with biotechnology company Grail to provide members with a multi-cancer early detection (MCED) test, or liquid biopsy, that screens for 50 different types of cancers, including the Galleri test, which is a blood-based MCED test developed by GRAIL. The test reviews DNA patterns of different types of cancers before they become symptomatic.

In February 2025, the company announced a partnership with the National Basketball Players Association. The partnership provided NBPA members with access to its lab tests, which Forbes reported is "significantly more" than players receive in their standard medical panels through their teams. In April 2025, the company partnered with Thatch, an employer health benefit platform, to offer employees access to preventive diagnostic testing.

In January 2026, Function Health partnered with fast casual restaurant Sweetgreen to offer a limited-time menu developed under Hyman's guidance. In February 2026, the company partnered with grocery chain Erewhon for a limited edition smoothie.

== Blood draw volume requirement ==
According to Function Health's FAQ, the service requires "about 35-85 mL depending on the person," which usually comes out to five to 10 vials, collected across two separate visits to Quest Diagnostics locations.

== Criticism ==
Some doctors and academics have said that Function Health's tests are unnecessary and expensive, and may introduce patient anxiety. Jonathan Jarry, a researcher at McGill University's Office for Science and Society, has also criticized some of the claims made by Function Health, such as 25% of the population having heavy metal poisoning.
