= Sidransky =

Sidransky is a surname. Notable people with the surname include:

- Ellen Sidransky, American pediatrician and clinical geneticist
- Ruth Sidransky (1929–2017), American advocate for the deaf
