= Comfort =

Sense of physical or psychological ease

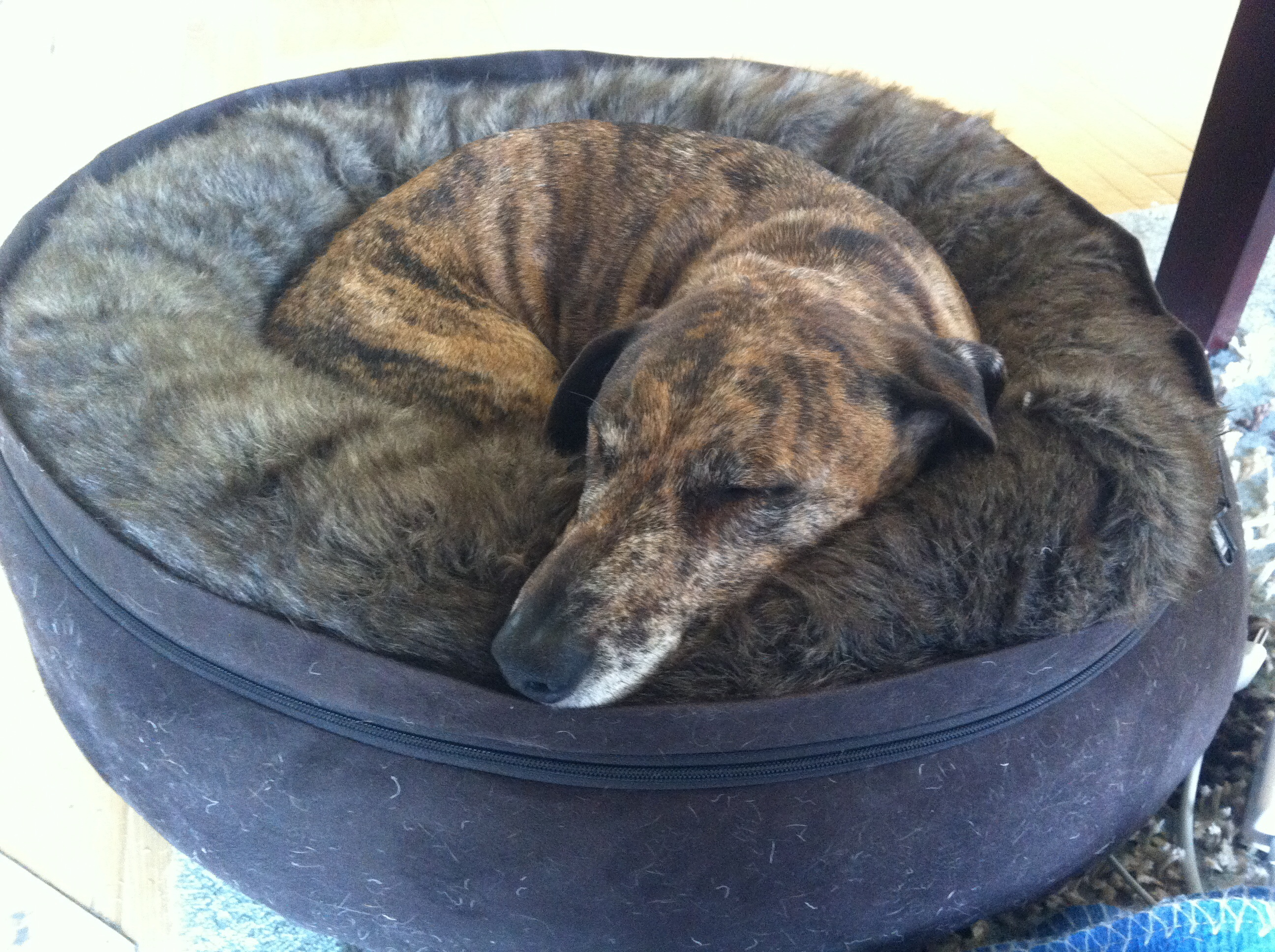
A comfortable dog

Comfort is a state of physical or psychological ease, often characterized by the absence of hardship. Individuals experiencing a lack of comfort are typically described as uncomfortable or in discomfort. A degree of psychological comfort can be achieved by recreating experiences that are associated with pleasant memories, such as engaging in familiar activities, maintaining the presence of familiar objects, and consumption of comfort foods. Comfort is a particular concern in health care, as providing comfort to the sick and injured is one goal of healthcare, and can facilitate recovery. The phrase "comfort zone" is sometimes used to describe a psychological state associated with perceived safety and familiarity. Because of the personal nature of positive associations, psychological comfort is highly subjective.

As a verb, "to comfort" generally denotes the act of providing relief to someone in pain, distress, or sorrow. Where the term is used to describe the support given to someone who has experienced a tragedy, the word is synonymous with consolation or solace. More broadly, comfort may also refer to the enhancement of a person's state of ease in the absence of explicit discomfort. For example, while sitting in a chair may not cause discomfort, the addition of a pillow can increase a person’s perceived physical comfort.

== Concepts ==
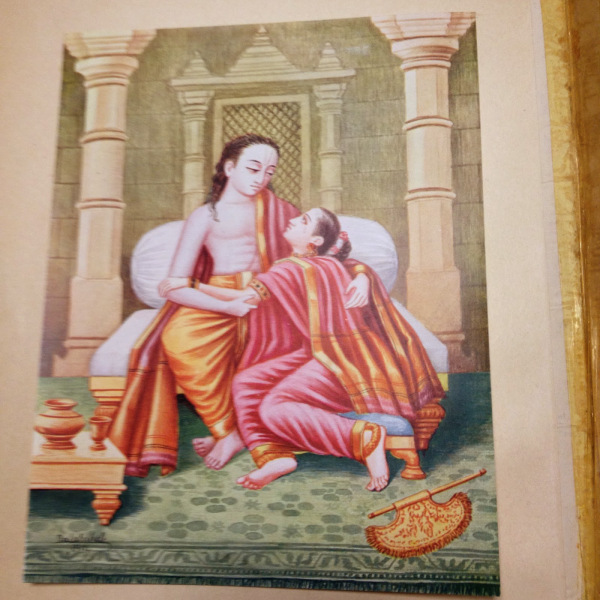
Rama comforts Sita

Psychological research has explored various aspects of comfort, suggesting that while individual experiences of comfort are highly subjective, certain patterns have emerged. Commonly studied forms of physical comfort include contact comfort, comfort food, and thermal comfort. These categories have been identified across multiple studies as recurring factors in how individuals perceive and respond to comfort stimuli.

=== Contact comfort ===
Contact comfort is satisfaction with someone's touch, like a parent's embrace. This is essential to a child's development.

A well-known study by psychologist Harry Harlow investigated the role of contact comfort using infant rhesus monkeys. The monkeys were separated from their biological mothers and provided with two types of surrogate mothers—one made of wire and another covered in soft cloth. Both surrogates provided nourishment through a feeding nozzle. Despite both surrogates meeting the monkeys' nutritional needs, the monkeys showed a clear preference for the cloth-covered surrogate, spending significantly more time with it. This behavior suggested the importance of tactile stimulation and affection in psychological development.

This experiment justified that importance of comfort and warmth for child development. All the monkeys that grew up from the experiment expressed a behavior of aggression and atypical sexual behaviors.

=== Comfort food ===
Comfort foods are foods that, when taken, produce feelings of psychological well-being or emotional relief. According to research, these preferences are frequently linked to the individual's eating history and early experiences, including family-cooked meals.

Comfort foods are often selected based on past experiences that evoke positive emotions. For instance, chocolate is frequently identified as a common comfort food, possibly due to its sweet flavor and its cultural association with rewards and celebrations. The time of day also play a role in consuming comfort foods. In one study, only a portion of eating episodes were found to be driven by actual hunger, with routine or social cues serving as primary motivators in many cases.

Popular comfort foods
	Favorite comfort foods	Percent mentioning item as their favorite comfort food
Snack- related foods	Potato chips	23
Snack- related foods	Ice cream	14
Snack- related foods	Cookies	12
Snack- related foods	Candy/chocolate	11
Meal- related foods	Pasta or pizza	11
Meal- related foods	Steak or beef burgers	9
Meal- related foods	Casseroles or side dishes	9
Meal- related foods	Vegetables or salads	7
Meal- related foods	Soup	4

Food preferences split into two categories: snack-related and meal-related. Research suggests that individuals exposed to frequent snacking during childhood may be more likely to favor snack-related comfort foods later in life. Food preference ranges through male/female, and younger/older. Females and the young demographic prefer snack-related comfort foods, while the male and older demographic prefer meal-related comfort foods.

=== Thermal comfort ===
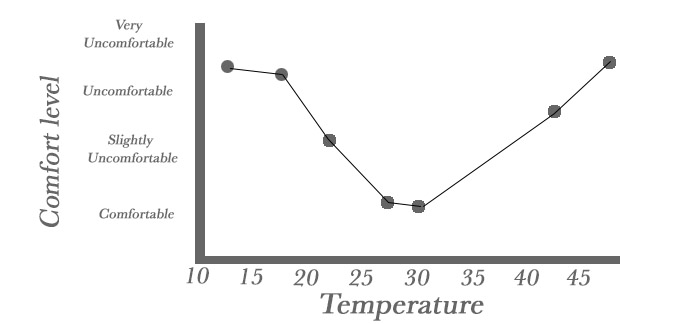
Comfort level average on the temperature

Thermal comfort is a satisfaction of the ambient air temperature and humidity. Psychologists devised a study to determine the most comfortable temperature. The study had people answering a survey as the temperature changed around them. From the surveys, psychologist found many people had no opinion of a range of temperature. This was labeled temperature neutrality, which is the rate that the person's metabolism is shifting the same rate as the surrounding temperature. The average comfortable temperature is 30 °C (86 °F). Temperatures too hot (35 °C (95 °F) and above) and temperatures too low (12 °C (54 °F) and below) are considered uncomfortable to many people.

Thermal neutrality (thermal neutral zone) is the temperature range where it is neither comfortable nor uncomfortable. The human body's metabolism is burning calories at the same rate as the temperature around. This would be around 24 °C (75 °F) (room temperature), and people have no opinion about the temperature. Thermal neutrality is often also used in animal raising. For example, farmers maintain the neutral temperature for cattle to prevent cold stress.

==== Everyday uses ====
- Floor surface temperature – too hot or too cold floors cause discomfort, and people may wear light shoes or have heated floors.
- Ventilation – no proper air flow throughout a room causes the room to be too hot. Windows and fans allow a human-made air current, and air conditioning helps with the heat.

=== Clothing comfort ===
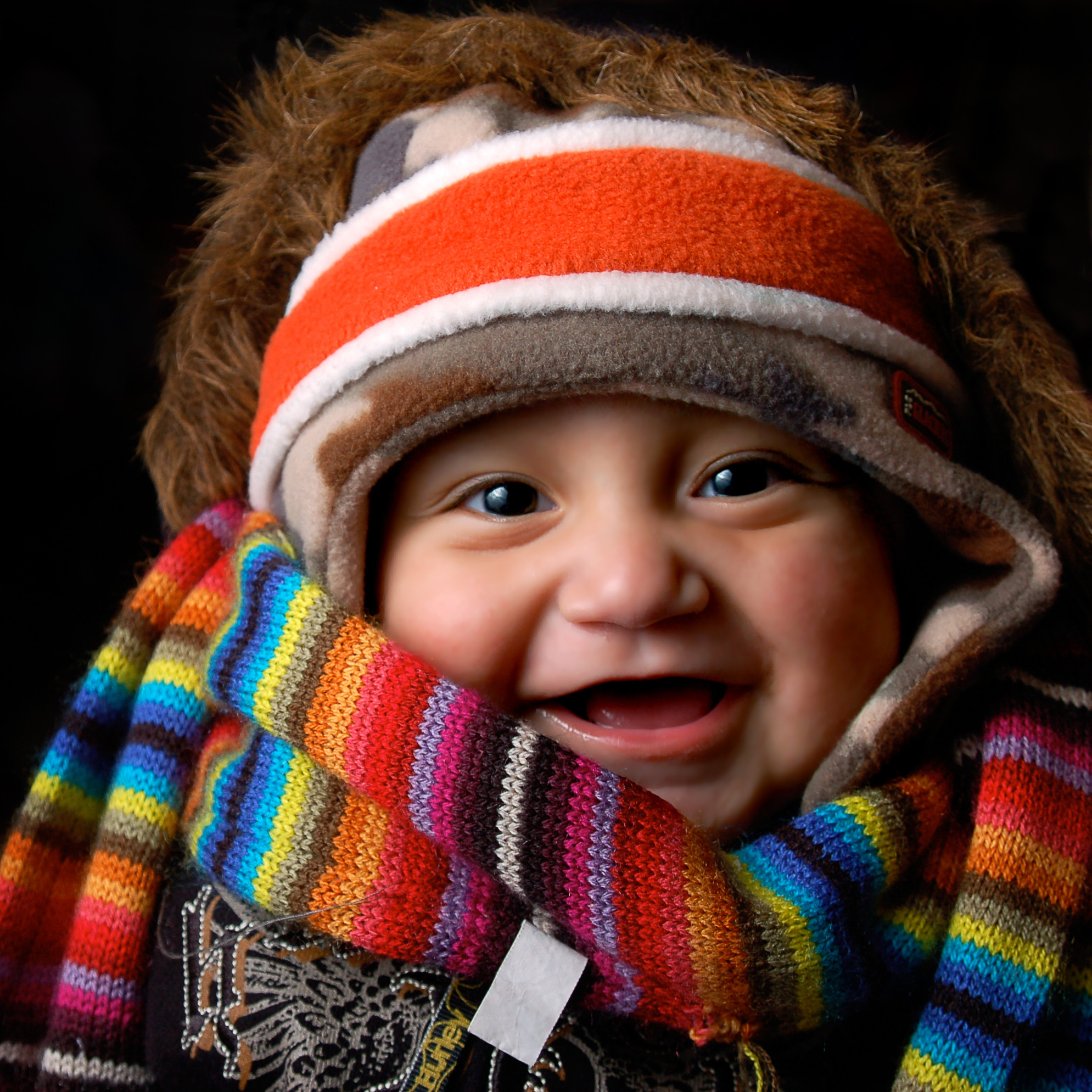
A baby wearing many items of winter clothing: headband, cap, fur-lined coat, scarf and sweater

Clothing plays a significant role in fulfilling various comfort-related needs, and after food, clothing is one of the significant objects that suffices for comfort requirements. It contributes to comfort through multiple dimensions, including aesthetic appeal, tactile sensation, thermal regulation, moisture management, and pressure distribution.

- Aesthetic comfort: visual perception is influenced by color, fabric construction, style, garment fit, fashion compatibility, and finish of clothing material. Aesthetic comfort is necessary for psychological and social comfort.
- Thermophysiological comfort is the ability of clothing materials to support the thermal and moisture balance between the body and the environment. It is a property of textile materials that creates ease by maintaining moisture and thermal levels in a human's resting and active states. The type of textile fiber used in clothing significantly influences thermophysiological comfort. Different textile fibers have unique properties that make them suitable for use in various environments. Natural fibers are breathable and absorb moisture, and synthetic fibers are hydrophobic; they repel moisture and do not allow air to pass. Different environments demand a diverse selection of clothing materials. Hence, the appropriate choice is important. It is primarily determined by the thermo-regulatory properties of textile materials, including permeability, heat dissipation, and moisture transfer rates.
  - Thermal comfort: one primary criterion for our physiological needs is thermal comfort. The heat dissipation effectiveness of clothing gives the wearer a "neither too cold nor too hot" feel. Around 30 °C (86 °F), the human body is at ease. Clothing maintains a thermal balance; it keeps the skin dry and cool. It helps to keep the body from overheating while avoiding heat from the environment.
  - Moisture comfort: moisture comfort is the prevention of a damp sensation.
- Tactile comfort: tactile comfort is a resistance to the discomfort related to the friction created by clothing against the body. It is related to the smoothness, roughness, softness, and stiffness of the fabric used in clothing. The degree of tactile discomfort may vary between individuals. It is possible due to various factors, including allergies, tickling, prickling, skin abrasion, coolness, and the fabric's weight, structure, and thickness. There are specific surface finishes (mechanical and chemical) that can enhance tactile comfort. Fleece sweatshirts and velvet clothing, for example, may be comforting to some people. Soft, clingy, stiff, heavy, light, hard, sticky, scratchy, prickly are all terms used to describe tactile sensations.
- Pressure comfort: the comfort of the human body's pressure receptors' (present in the skin) sensory response towards clothing. Fabric with lycra may feel more comfortable because of this response and superior pressure comfort. The sensation response is influenced by the material's structure: snugging, looseness, heavy, light, soft, or stiff structuring.

=== Other types of comfort ===
In addition to physical and psychological dimensions, human comfort also encompasses visual, acoustic, and respiratory components.

Visual comfort is defined as "the state of mind that expresses satisfaction with the visual environment." This type of comfort can be achieved when an individual has a sufficient amount of light to perform an activity or task. It is possible for both low and high levels of light to create discomfort.

Acoustic comfort is a state of being where noise levels are not harming or interfering with the activities of individuals in some area.

Respiratory comfort is achieved in an environment where the air breathed is of sufficiently high quality. In indoor spaces this type of comfort can be predicted by the indoor air quality (IAQ). IAQ is dependent on the quantity of pollutants in the air, the ventilation rate, and the turnover rate of pollutants. In outdoor spaces respiratory comfort can be associated with the air quality index.

== See also ==
- Comfort noise, artificial background noise used in radio and wireless communications to fill the silent time in a transmission
- Comfort object, an object used to provide psychological comfort
- Comfort women, a euphemism for women who were forced to work as sex slaves in Japanese-occupied countries during World War II
- Contentment
- Pleasure
- Kolcaba's theory of comfort
