= Kolcaba's theory of comfort =

Psychological theory by Katherine Kolcaba

Kolcaba's theory of comfort explains comfort as a fundamental need of all human beings for relief, ease, or transcendence arising from health care situations that are stressful. Comfort can enhance health-seeking behaviors for patients, family members, and nurses. The major concept within Katharine Kolcaba's theory is the comfort. The other related concepts include caring, comfort measures, holistic care, health seeking behaviors, institutional integrity, and intervening variables.

Kolcaba's theory successfully addresses the four elements of nursing metaparadigm. Providing comfort in physical, psychospiritual, social, and environmental aspects in order to reduce harmful tension is a conceptual assertion of this theory. When nursing interventions are effective, the outcome of enhanced comfort is attained.

This theory was derived from Watson's theory of human care and her own practice. Kolcaba was a head nurse asked to define her job as a nurse outside of specialized responsibilities. She realized the lack of written knowledge on the subject of comfort being important in patient care. The first publication was in 1994, then expanded in an article in 2001, and further developed in a book written in 2003.

Kolcaba's theory became so popular that it was tested in multiple studies such as: women with early stage breast cancer going through radiation therapy conducted by Kolcaba and Fox in 1999, persons with urinary frequency and incontinence conducted by Dowd, Kolcaba, and Steiner in 2000, and persons near end of life conducted by Novak, Kolcaba, Steiner, and Dowd in 2001.
