= Journal of Holistic Nursing =

- Discipline: Nursing, alternative medicine
- Language: English
- Edited by: W. Richard Cowling

Publication details
- History: 1983-present
- Publisher: SAGE Publications (United States)
- Frequency: Quarterly

Standard abbreviations
- ISO 4: J. Holist. Nurs.

Indexing
- CODEN: JHNUF8
- ISSN: 0898-0101 (print); 1552-5724 (web)
- OCLC no.: 12391430

Links
- Journal homepage; Online access; Online archive

The Journal of Holistic Nursing, or JHN for short, is a peer-reviewed nursing journal, published by SAGE Publications. The journal was established in 1983 and aims to facilitate integration of holistic perspectives of holistic nursing with medicine. It is an official journal of the American Holistic Nurses Association.

== Mission ==
Incorporating the concepts of self-care, wellness, and preventive intervention into your everyday practice. Implementation of intuitive of self-care, wellness, and preventive intervention that you can incorporate into your everyday practice to continue your personal and professional transformation of different approaches that pertain to both patient care and lifestyle that will help you sharpen your skills and become more clinically competent of intuitive as well as analytic skills.

== Abstracting and indexing ==
The Journal of Holistic Nursing is abstracted and indexed by CINAHL, MEDLINE, ProQuest, SafetyLit, and Scopus.
