= Emi Gal =

Romanian American entrepreneur

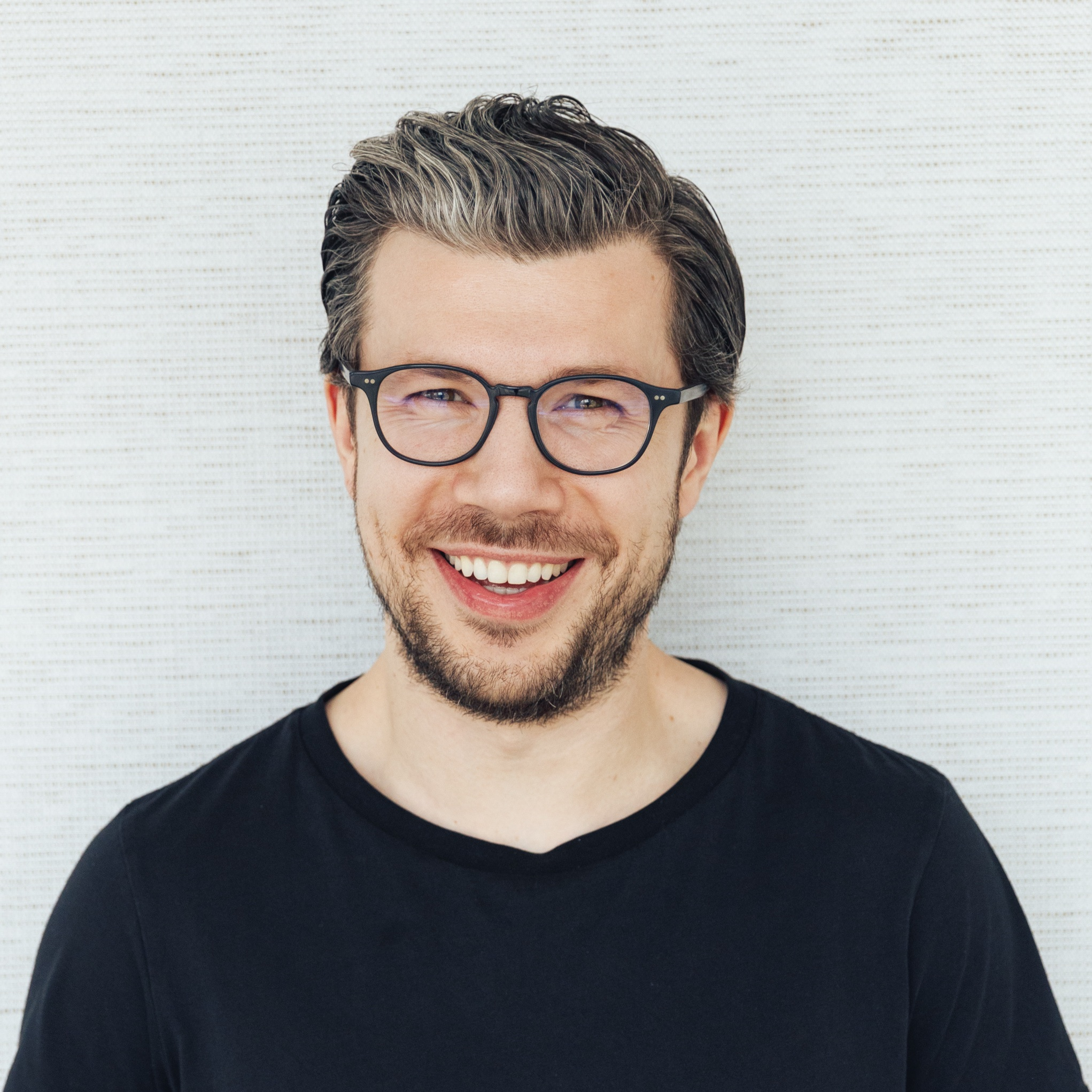
- Born: Emanuel Gal; Bucharest, Romania
- Education: Spiru Haret University
- Occupations: Romanian software engineer and serial entrepreneur
- Website: https://www.emigal.com

Emanuel "Emi" Gal (born February 6, 1986) is a Romanian software engineer and serial entrepreneur based in the United States. He is the founder and CEO of Ezra, an AI-powered medical imaging company acquired by Function Health in 2025, and the co-founder and former CEO of Brainient, an advertising technology company acquired by Teads in 2016.

Gal was born in Bucharest, Romania. He studied Applied Mathematics and Computer Science at Spiru Haret University in Bucharest.

== Career ==
Brainient (2006–2016)

In 2006, at age 19 and during his first year at university, Gal founded Brainient, an interactive video advertising technology company. The company won Seedcamp Week 2009 and was profiled by The Guardian in 2010. In September 2016, Teads acquired Brainient and rebranded the unit as Teads Studio.

Ezra (2018–2025)

In 2018, Gal founded Ezra, with the mission to detect cancer early using AI-powered MRI technology.

Ezra launched initially with MRI-based prostate screening and later, full-body MRI services. The company raised a Series A in 2020 and other financing in 2024.

Trade press reported Ezra’s 2020 U.S. FDA 510(k) clearance for prostate MRI segmentation AI and later clearances for Ezra Flash, an image-processing tool to improve MRI image quality and support shorter protocols.

In May 2025, Function Health acquired Ezra.

== Recognition ==
- Named among the “50 Coolest People in UK Tech” by Business Insider (2014).
- Appeared on the cover of Forbes România for its inaugural “30 sub 30” list (2012).
- Seedcamp Week 2009 winner.
