= Katharine Kolcaba =

American nurse

- Born: December 28, 1944 (age 81)
- Known for: Nursing theory
- Scientific career
- Fields: Nursing

Katharine Kolcaba (born December 28, 1944, in Cleveland, Ohio) is an American nursing theorist and nursing professor. Dr. Kolcaba is responsible for the Theory of Comfort, a broad-scope mid-range nursing theory commonly implemented throughout the nursing field up to the institutional level.

== Education ==
Kolcaba earned a nursing diploma from St. Luke's Hospital School of Nursing in 1965. Kolcaba completed graduate work at Case Western Reserve University, earning a Master of Science in Nursing with a specialization in Gerontology in 1987 and a PhD in Nursing in 1997.

== Career ==
Kolcaba's career includes nursing practice in the operating room, medical/surgical nursing, home health, and long-term care.

Kolcaba is an Associate Professor Emeritus at University of Akron and holds an adjunct position at Ursuline College.

== Awards and honors ==
2007: Distinguished Alumni Award, The Cleveland General and St. Luke's Nurses' Alumni Association
1994–Present: Who's Who in American Nursing

== Nursing Theory of Comfort ==
During Kolcaba's graduate studies at Case Western Reserve University, she became interested in comfort as a theoretical construct while concurrently working as a head nurse on a unit for dementia patients. While the concept of comfort is as old as the nursing profession, Kolcaba's theory allowed for objective measurement of comfort and defined features central to the concept of comfort. The Theory of Comfort considers the concepts of relief, ease and transcendence across four dimensions - physical, psychospiritual, sociocultural and environmental. The juxtaposition of the three levels of comfort and four contexts of comfort is referred to as the “Taxonomic Structure of Comfort”. Using the taxonomic structure as a tool allows researchers to easily apply the theory in their specialty to operationalize the idea of comfort and apply it to experimental research rather than a reliance on observational research.

== Scope of Theory ==
The Comfort Theory (CT) is a broad-scope middle range theory because it contains concepts and relationships, is adaptable to a wide range of practice settings and experiences, can be built from many sources and it can be tested and measured. It also qualifies as a middle range theory because of its direct applicability to nursing practice. It is broad in the sense that it also considers nursing practice holistically, however the concepts of the theory can be used separately or in combination with each other in nursing practice settings.

== Works ==
=== Journals ===
- Estridge, K., Morris, D., Kolcaba, K., & Winkleman, C. (2018). Comfort and fluid retention in adult patients receiving hemodialysis. Nephrology Nursing Journal, 45(1), 25–33.
- Boudiab, L. & Kolcaba, K. (2015). Comfort theory: Unraveling the complexities of Veterans’ health care needs. Advances in Nursing Science, (38) 4, 270–278.
- Paiva, R., de Carvalho, A., Kolcaba, K, & Paiva, C. (2015). Validation of the holistic comfort questionnaire- caregiver in Portuguese- Brazil in a cohort of informal caregivers of palliative care cancer patients. Supportive Care in Cancer, 23(2). DOI 10.1007/s00520-014-2370-5.
- Parks, M., Morris, D., Kolcaba, K., & McDonald, P. (2015). An evaluation of patient comfort during acute psychiatric hospitalization. Perspectives in Psychiatric Care. DOI: 10.1111/ppc.12134.
- Maeboubeh, R. & Kolcaba, K. (2014). Comfort and hope in perianesthesia nursing. Journal of PeriAnesthesia Nursing, 29(3), 213-220
- Kolcaba, K. & Dowd, T. (2010). Measurement tools: Comfort Touch. Connections in Holistic Nursing Research, 2 (2), 4–5.
- Dowd, T., Kolcaba, K., Steiner, R., & Fashinpaur, D., (2007). Comparison of healing touch and coaching on stress and comfort in young college students. Holistic Nursing Practice, 21(4), 194–202.
- Dowd, T., Kolcaba, K., & Steiner, R. (2006). Development of an instrument to measure holistic client comfort as an outcome of healing touch. Holistic Nursing Practice, 20(3), 122–129.
- Kolcaba, K., Schirm, V. & Steiner, R. (2006). Effects of hand massage on comfort of nursing home residents. Geriatric Nursing, 27(2), 85–91.
- Kolcaba, K., Tilton, C., & Drouin, C. (2006). Comfort theory: A unifying framework to enhance the practice environment. Journal of Nursing Administration, 36(11), 538–544.
- Kolcaba, K., & DiMarco, M. (2005). Comfort theory and its application to pediatric nursing. Pediatric Nursing, 31(3), 187–194.
- Kolcaba, K., Dowd, T., Steiner, R., & Mitzel, A. (2004). Efficacy of hand massage for enhancing comfort of hospice patients. Journal of Hospice and Palliative Care, 6(2), 91–101.
- Schirm, V., Baumgardner, J., Dowd, T., Gregor, S., & Kolcaba, K. (2004). Development of a healthy bladder education program for older adults. Geriatric Nursing, 25(5), 301–306.
- Dowd, T., Kolcaba, K., & Steiner, R. (2003). The addition of coaching to cognitive strategies: Interventions for persons with compromised urinary bladder syndrome. Journal of Ostomy and Wound Management, 30(2), 90–99.
- Dowd, T., Kolcaba, K., & Steiner, R. (2002). Correlations among six measures of bladder function. Journal of Nursing Measurement, 10(1), 27–38.
- Dowd, T., Kolcaba, K. & Steiner, R. (2000). Cognitive strategies to enhance comfort and decrease episodes of urinary incontinence. Holistic Nursing Practice, 14(2), 91–102.
- Novak, B., Kolcaba, K., Steiner, R., & Dowd, T. (2001). Measuring comfort in families and patients during end of life care. American Journal of Hospice and Palliative Care, 13(3), 170–180.
- Kolcaba, K. (2001). Evolution of the mid range theory of comfort for outcomes research. Nursing Outlook, 49(2), 86–92.
- Kolcaba, K., Panno, J., & Holder, C. (2000). Acute care for elders (ACE): A holistic model for geriatric orthopaedic nursing care. Journal of Orthopaedic Nursing, 19(6), 53–60.
- Kolcaba, K., & Steiner, R. (2000). Empirical evidence for the nature of holistic comfort. Journal of Holistic Nursing, 18(1), 46–62.
- Kolcaba, K., & Fox, C. (1999). The effects of guided imagery on comfort of women with early-stage breast cancer going through radiation therapy. Oncology Nursing Forum, 26(1), 67–71.
- Vendlinski, S., & Kolcaba, K. (1997). Comfort care: A framework for hospice nursing. American Journal of Hospice and Palliative Care, 14 (6), 271–276.
- Fox, C., & Kolcaba, K. (1996). Decision making in unsafe practice situations. Revolution: The Journal of Nurse Empowerment, Spring, 68–69.
- Kolcaba, K. & Wykle, M. (1996). Comfort research: Spreading comfort around the world. Reflections: Sigma Theta Tau International, 23(2), 12–13.
- Kolcaba, K., & Fisher, E. (1996). A holistic perspective on comfort care as an advance directive. Critical Care Nursing Quarterly, 18(4), 66–76.
- Kolcaba, K. (1995). The art of comfort care. Image: The Journal of Nursing Scholarship, 27, 293–295.
- Kolcaba, K. (1995). Process and product of comfort care, merged in holistic nursing art. Journal of Holistic Nursing, 13(2), 117–131.
- Kinion, E., & Kolcaba, K. (1992). Plato's model of the psyche. Journal of Holistic Nursing, 10, 218‑230.
- Schuiling, K., Sampselle, C., & Kolcaba, K. (2011) Exploring the presence of comfort within the context of childbirth. In R. Bryar & S. Sinclair Theory for midwifery practice (2nd ed.). UK: Macmillan. 197-214.
- Wagner, D., Byrne, M., & Kolcaba, K. (2006). Effect of comfort warming on preoperative patients. AORN Journal, 84(3), 1–13.
- Wilson, L., & Kolcaba, K. (2004). Practical application of Comfort Theory in the perianesthesia setting. Journal of PeriAnesthesia Nursing. 19(3), 164–173.
- Kolcaba, K., & Kolcaba, R. (2003). Fiduciary decision-making using comfort care. Philosophy in the Contemporary World, 10(1), 81–86.
- Kolcaba, K., & Wilson, L. (2002). The framework of comfort care for perianesthesia nursing. Journal of PeriAnesthesia Nursing, 17(2), 102–114.
- Kolcaba, K., Dowd, T., Steiner, R., & Mitzel, A. (2004). Efficacy of hand massage for enhancing comfort of hospice patients. Journal of Hospice and Palliative Care, 6(2), 91–101.
- Kolcaba, K., & Kolcaba, R. (2003). Fiduciary decision-making using comfort care. Philosophy in the Contemporary World, 10(1), 81–86.
- Kolcaba, K., & Wilson, L. (2002). The framework of comfort care for perianesthesia nursing. Journal of PeriAnesthesia Nursing, 17(2), 102–114.
- Kolcaba, K (2001). "Evolution of the mid range theory of comfort for outcomes research". Nursing Outlook. 49 (2): 86–92. doi:10.1067/mno.2001.110268. PMID 11309563.
- Kolcaba, K., Panno, J., & Holder, C. (2000). Acute care for elders (ACE): A holistic model for geriatric orthopaedic nursing care. Journal of Orthopaedic Nursing, 19(6), 53–60.
- Kolcaba, K., & Steiner, R. (2000). Empirical evidence for the nature of holistic comfort. Journal of Holistic Nursing, 18(1), 46–62.
- Kolcaba, K., & Fox, C. (1999). The effects of guided imagery on comfort of women with early-stage breast cancer going through radiation therapy. Oncology Nursing Forum, 26(1), 67–71.
- Kolcaba, K. & Wykle, M. (1996). Comfort research: Spreading comfort around the world. Reflections: Sigma Theta Tau International, 23(2), 12–13.
- Kolcaba, K., & Fisher, E. (1996). A holistic perspective on comfort care as an advance directive. Critical Care Nursing Quarterly, 18(4), 66–76.
- Kolcaba, K. (1995). The art of comfort care. Image: The Journal of Nursing Scholarship, 27, 293–295.
- Kolcaba, K. (1995). Process and product of comfort care, merged in holistic nursing art. Journal of Holistic Nursing, 13(2), 117–131.
- Kolcaba, K (1994). "A Theory of Comfort for Nursing". Journal of Advanced Nursing. 19 (6): 1178–1184. doi:10.1111/j.1365-2648.1994.tb01202.x. PMID 7930099.
- Kolcaba, R., & Kolcaba, K. (1994). Health maintenance as a responsibility for self. Philosophy in the Contemporary World, 1(2), 19–24.
- Kolcaba, K., & Wykle, M. (1994). Assessment of health promotion in long‑term care. Geriatric Nursing, 15, 266–269.
- Kolcaba, K. (1992). Holistic comfort: Operationalizing the construct as a nurse‑sensitive outcome. Advances in Nursing Science, 15(1), 1‑10.
- Kolcaba, K. (1992). The concept of comfort in an environmental framework. Journal of Gerontological Nursing, 18(6), 33‑38.
- Kolcaba, K. (1991). A taxonomic structure for the concept comfort: Synthesis and application. Image: Journal of Nursing Scholarship, 23, 237‑240.
- Kolcaba, K., & Kolcaba, R. (1991). An analysis of the concept comfort. Journal of Advanced Nursing, 16, 1301‑1310.
- Kolcaba, K., & Miller, C. (1989). Geropharmacology: A nursing intervention. Journal of Gerontological Nursing, 15(5), 29‑35.

=== White Paper ===
“Integration of Insights about the Human Perception of Comfort,” for Magna Corporation, a leader in specialized automotive seating, January 2018. Recruited by Idea Connection.

=== Books and Chapters in Books ===
- Kolcaba, K. (2004, 2008, 2010, 2013, 2017). “Comfort.” Chapter in Middle Range Theories: Application to Nursing Research (& Bredow, Eds). Phila, PA: Lippincott Williams & Wilkins.
- Kolcaba, K. (2010, 2012 & 2015) Katharine Kolcaba’s Comfort Theory. In M. Parker & M. Smith (Eds.). Nursing Theories & Nursing Practice. (3rd edition, P. 389-401).
- Kolcaba, K. (2010, 2012. 2015.) Impaired Comfort. In B. Ackley & G. Ladwig (Eds.). Nursing Diagnosis Handbook: An evidence-based guide to planning care. (9th edition, P. 222-225), (10th edition, P. 210-213).
- Schuiling, K., Sampselle, C., & Kolcaba, K. (2011) Using comfort theory as a framework for research on childbirth. In R. Bryar & S. Sinclair, (2011) Theory for midwifery practice (2nd ed.). UK: Macmillan.
- Kolcaba, K. (2010). Impaired Comfort. In B. Ackley & G. Ladwig (Eds.). Nursing Diagnosis Handbook: An evidence-based guide to planning care. (9th edition), P. 222-225.
- Kolcaba, K. & Kolcaba, R. (2010). Integrative Theorizing: Linking Middle-Range Nursing Theories with the Neuman Systems Model. In The Neuman Systems Model (5th edition, Neuman, B & Fawcett, J, Eds).
- Kolcaba, K. & Kolcaba, R. (2010). Opening Theoretical Boxes: Driving Evidence Based Pracetice through Integrative Theorizing. In B. Neuman & F. Fawcett (Eds).), The Neuman System Model (5th edition). Upper Saddle River, NJ: Prentice-Hall.
- Mitzel, A., & Kolcaba, K. (2008). Two chapters: Hand Massage; Simple Massage. In Ackley, Ladwig, Swan & Tucker (Eds.), A clinical guide to evidence-based practice in nursing (402-407; 504-508). Philadelphia: Elsevier.
- Dowd, T. (2001 & 2005). Chapter 24: Katharine Kolcaba: Comfort Theory. In Nursing theorists and their work (Alliggod & Tomey, eds, 56h Ed., pp. 430–442). St. Louis, MI: Mosby.
- Kolcaba, K. (2003 and 2007). The theory of comfort [Peterson S. & Bredow, T., Eds.] Middle range theories: Application to nursing research. Philadelphia: Lippincott, Williams, & Wilkins. Pgs. 254-272.
- Kolcaba, K. (2003). Comfort theory and practice: A vision for holistic health care and research. Springer Publishing Co.
- Kolcaba, K. (2001). Sub-Chapter entitled “Kolcaba’s Theory of Comfort” in Core concepts for advanced nursing practice (pp. 418–422). St. Louis: Mosby.
- Kolcaba, K. (2001). Chapter 5: Holistic care: Is it feasible in today’s health care environment? In H. Feldman (Ed.), Nursing leaders speak out (pp. 49–54) and formula for the outside. NY: Springer.

=== Significant Citations ===
D. Robinson, & C. Kish (2001). Core concepts in advanced practice nursing, Section VI, Theoretical foundations: Kolcaba’s theory of comfort (pp. 418–422).

B. Kozier, G. Erb, A. Berman, & K. Burke (2000). Fundamentals of nursing: Concepts process, and practice (6th Ed.). Chapter 25: Caring, comforting, and communicating (pp. 430–431). New York: Prentice Hall.

Phillips, L., & Ayres, M. (1999). Supportive and nonsupportive care environments for the elderly. In. A. Hinshaw, S. Feetham, & J. Shaver (Eds.), Handbook of Clinical Nursing (pp. 600–603). Newbury Park, CA:Sage.
