= Holistic nursing =

Medical care practice

Holistic nursing is a form of treating and taking care of the patient, which involves physical, social, environmental, psychological, cultural and religious factors, in exactly the same manner as non-holistic nursing. There are many theories that support the importance of nurses approaching the patient holistically. In education, there is support for the practice of holistic nursing. Unfortunately, none of these theories differentiate between nursing and holistic nursing. Holistic nursing emphasizes that patients be treated not only in their body but also their mind and spirit. It focuses on the mind, body, and spirit working together as a whole and how spiritual awareness in nursing can help heal illness. Holistic medicine focuses on prevention and maintaining optimum well-being rather than just treating disease.

== Core values ==
=== The holistic philosophy: theory and ethics ===
Holistic nursing is based on the fundamental theories of nursing, such as the works of Florence Nightingale and Jean Watson as well as alternative theories of world connectedness, wholeness, and healing. Holistic nurses respect the patient as the decision-maker throughout the continuum of care. The holistic nurse and patient relationship is based on a partnership in which the holistic nurse engages the patient in treatment options and healthcare choices. The holistic nurse seeks to establish a professional and ethical relationship with the patient in order to preserve the patient's sense of dignity, wholesomeness, and inner worth.

=== Theories of holistic nursing ===
The goal for holistic nursing is in the definition of holistic where it is to treat the patient in whole not just physically. Various nursing theories have helped on viewing the importance holistic nursing. These theories may differ on the views of holistic nursing care but have a common goal, which is to treat the patient in whole body and mind. One of the theories is The Intersystem Model, explaining that individuals are holistic beings; therefore, their illnesses are interacted and adapted to them as a whole not just physically. Also health can be a different value to individuals which ranges constantly from well-being to disease. For example, despite their chronic condition, the patient is satisfied with the changed healthy life for their living. In holistic nursing, knowing the theory does not mean that this will be implanted in doing. In real life practice, many nurses are not able to apply the theory.

=== Holistic caring process ===
Holistic nursing combines standard nursing interventions with various modalities that are focused on treating the patient in totality. Alternative therapies can include stress management, aromatherapy, and therapeutic touch. The combination of interventions allows the patient to heal in mind, body, and spirit by focusing on the patient's emotions, spirituality, and cultural identity as equally as the illness. The six steps of the holistic caring process occur simultaneously, including assessment, diagnosis, outcomes, therapeutic plan of care, implementation, and evaluation. The holistic assessment of the patient can include spiritual, transpersonal, and energy-field assessments in combination with the standard physical and emotional assessments. In holistic nursing, the plan of care is individualized to each patient and adapts as the patient's condition or needs change. Holistic nurses emphasize the dynamic nature of healing and develop care plans that integrate physical, emotional, social, and spiritual dimensions of health. Therapies utilized by holistic nurses include stress management techniques and complementary practices such as reiki and guided imagery. These therapy modalities are focused on empowering individuals to reduce stress levels and elicit a relaxation response in order to promote healing and well-being.

The caring for patients in holistic nursing may differ from other nursing care as some may lack in caring for the patient as a whole, which includes spiritually. In holistic nursing, taking care of the patient does not differ from other nursing, but is focused on mental and spiritual needs as well as physical health. In holistic nursing, there would be a therapeutic trust between the patient and nurse, as caring holistically involves knowing the patient's illness as a whole. This can be only done by the patient who tells the nurse about the social, spiritual and internal illness that they are experiencing. Caring can involve assertive action, quiet support, or both to assist in understanding a person's cultural differences, physical and social needs. Through this method, the nurse is able to provide holistic care to meet the social and spiritual needs of the patient. The attitude of nurses includes helping, sharing and nurturing. In holistic caring, there is spiritual care where there's an understanding of a patient's beliefs and religious views. In order to understand and respect the patient's religious beliefs, the nurses have to receive information from the patient directly which would be difficult if there is no therapeutic trust. There is no specific routine for how to care holistically, but the principle of holistic caring is to include a patient's social and internal needs and not solely on treating the physical illness.

=== Holistic communication ===
Holistic nurses use intentional listening techniques ("Focus completely on the speaker") and unconditional positive regard to communicate with patients. The goal of using these communication techniques is to create authentic, compassionate, and therapeutic relationships with each patient.

In holistic nursing, having therapeutic trust with both the patient and nurse provides a great advantage of treating patients as a whole. Therapeutic trust can be developed by having a conversation with the patient. When conversing, the sender can also become a receiver or vice versa. In holistic nursing, the nurses are the receiver of patients' concern and relays information to the doctor. Communication is a vital element in nursing as it is strongly recommended for nurses to understand what is needed and how to communicate with patients. Communicating with patients can help in the performance of holistic nursing as it will add in being able to understand the cultural, social values and psychological conditions. Through this interaction, the nurses are able to satisfy the needs of a patient. Non-verbal communication is also another skill that is taught to nurses which are expressed by gestures, facial expression, posture, and creating physical barriers. All individuals are different, however, their social and psychological illness should be treated based on how they communicate in order to build a therapeutic trust. Without these communicating skills, holistic nurses would not be able to build therapeutic trust and will not be able to provide holistic care.

=== Building a therapeutic environment ===
Holistic nursing focuses on creating not only a therapeutic relationship with patients but also on creating a therapeutic environment for patients. Several of the therapies included in holistic nursing rely on therapeutic environments to be successful and effective. A therapeutic environment empowers patients to connect with the holistic nurse and with themselves introspectively.

Depending on the environment where the patient is, the holistic approach may be different, and knowing this will help nurses to achieve better results in holistic nursing. For patients with illness, trauma, and surgery, increasing sleep will benefit recovery, blood pressure, pain relief, and emotional wellbeing. As in a hospital there are many disturbances which can affect patients’ quality of sleep, and due to this, the patients are lacking in aid for healing, recovery, and emotional wellbeing. A nurse being able to note or take care of a patient's sleep will determine how closely they are approaching holistic nursing. Depending on the disease, some of the treatment may differ and may need further check-ups or programs for patients. For example, there are higher chances for women to experience cardiovascular disease, but there are fewer enrollments for cardiac rehabilitation programs compared to men. This was due to the environment of the hospital not being able to support females in completing the CR programs. Some examples are that physicians are less likely to refer women to CR programs and patients' thoughts against the safety of the program. In a situation like this, from the knowledge and education that comes from holistic nursing, the nurses will be able to approach the patient as they can relate to what the patient is going through, which gives more comfort and safety to patients in doing the programs.

=== Cultural diversity ===
Part of any type of nursing includes understanding the patient's comprehension level, ability to cope, social supports, and background or base knowledge. The nurse must use this information to effectively communicate with the patient and the patient's family, to build a trusting relationship, and to comprehensively educate the patient. The ability of a holistic nurse to build a therapeutic relationship with a patient is especially important. Holistic nurses ask themselves how they can culturally care for patients through holistic assessment because holistic nurses engage in ethical practices and the treatment of all aspects of the individual.

Australia has many different cultures, as there are many people who were born overseas and migrated to Australia, which allows for the experience of many cultural diversities. Culture can be defined as how people create collective beliefs and shared practices to make sense of their lived experiences, which is how concepts of language, religion and ethnicity are built in the culture. As the meaning of holistic nursing is to heal the person as a whole, knowing their cultural identities or backgrounds will help to reach that goal (Mariano, 2007). Understanding people's culture may help to approach treatment correctly for the patient, as it provides knowledge to nurses about how a patient's view of the concept of illness and disease relates to their values and identity. As in the holistic approach, culture, beliefs and values are essential components to achieve the goal. People's actions to promote, maintain and restore health and healing are mainly influenced by their culture, which is why knowing other cultures will assist in holistic nursing. By developing knowledge, communication, assessment skills and practices, nurses are guided to provide better experiences to patients who have diverse beliefs, values, and behaviours that respect their social, cultural and linguistic needs. For most patients and families, their decision on having treatment against illness or disease is made based on cultural beliefs. This means if the nurses are unable to understand and give information relating to what they believe, the patients will most likely reject the treatment and create hardship for holistic nursing.

=== Holistic education and research ===
Holistic registered nurses are responsible for learning the scope of practice established in Holistic Nursing: Scope and Standards of Practice(2007) and for incorporating every core value into daily practice. It is the holistic nurse's responsibility to become familiar with both conventional practices as well as alternative therapies and modalities. Through continuing education and research, the holistic nurse will remain updated on all treatment options for patients. Areas of research completed by holistic nurses includes: measurements of outcomes of holistic therapies, measurements of caring behaviors and spirituality, patient responsiveness to holistic care, and theory development in areas such as intentionality, empowerment, and several other topics.

The goal of holistic nursing is treat the patient's individual's social, cognitive, emotional and physical problems as well as understanding their spiritual and cultural beliefs. Involving holistic nursing in the education will help future nurses to be more familiar in the terms holistic and how to approach the concept. In the education of holistic nursing all other nursing knowledge is included which once again developed through reflective practice. In holistic nursing the nurses are taught on the five core values in caring, critical thinking, holism, nursing role development and accountability. These values help the nurse to be able to focus on the health care on the clients, their families and the allied health practitioners who is also involved in patient care. Education in holistic nursing is continuous education program which will be ongoing even after graduation to improve in reaching the goal. Education on holistic nursing would be beneficial to nurses if this concept is introduced earlier as repetition of educating holistic nursing could also be the revision of it. There is different education on commutating skills and an example would be the non-verbal and verbal communication with patients. This is done to improve when would the right or wrong to use the communication skill and how powerful skills this could be.

=== Holistic nurse self-care ===
Through the holistic nurse's integration of self-care, self-awareness, and self-healing practices, the holistic nurse is living the values that are taught to patients in practice. Holistic "nurses cannot facilitate healing unless they are in the process of healing themselves."

In order to provide holistic nursing to patient it is also important for nurses to take care of themselves. There are various ways which the nurses can heal, assess and care for themselves such as self-assessment, meditation, yoga, good nutrition, energy therapies, support and lifelong learning. By nurses being able achieve balance and harmony in their lives it can assist to understand how to take care of patient holistically. In Florida Atlantic University there is a program that focus on all caring aspects and recognize how to take care of others as well as on how to start evaluation on their own mind, body and spirit. Also there is Travis’ Wellness Model which explores the idea of “self-care, wellness results from an ongoing process of self-awareness, exploring options, looking within, receiving from others (education), trying out new options (growth), and constantly re-evaluating the entire process. Self-awareness and education precede personal growth and wellness”. This model of concepts shows being able to understand own status of health can benefit to patients and reach the goal of holistic nursing.

== Global initiatives ==
=== United States ===
American Holistic Nurses Association (AHNA): Mission Statement

"The Mission of the American Holistic Nurses Association is to illuminate holism in nursing practice, community, advocacy, research and education."

Certification

National certification in the US for holistic nursing is regulated by the American Holistic Nurses Certification Corporation (AHNCC). There are two levels of certification: one for nurses holding a bachelor's degree and one for nurses holding a master's degree. Accreditation through the AHNCC is approved by the American Nurses Credentialing Center (ANCC).

=== Canada ===
Canadian Holistic Nurses Association (CHNA): Mission Statement

"To support the practice of holistic nursing across Canada by: acting as a body of knowledge for its practitioners, by advocating with policy makers and provincial regulatory bodies and by educating Canadians on the benefits of complementary and integrative health care."

=== Australia ===
Australian Holistic Nurses Association (AHNA)

"The Mission of the Australian Holistic Nurses Association (AHNA) is to illuminate holism in nursing practice, research, and education; act as a body of knowledge for its practitioners; advocate with policymakers and regulatory bodies; and educate Australians on the benefits of Complementary and Alternative Medicine (CAM) and integrative health care."

== See also ==
- Alternative medicine
- Alternative Therapies in Health and Medicine
- Journal of Holistic Nursing
- Nursing
