= Harpal Kumar =

British medical researcher (born 1965)

Sir Harpal Kumar
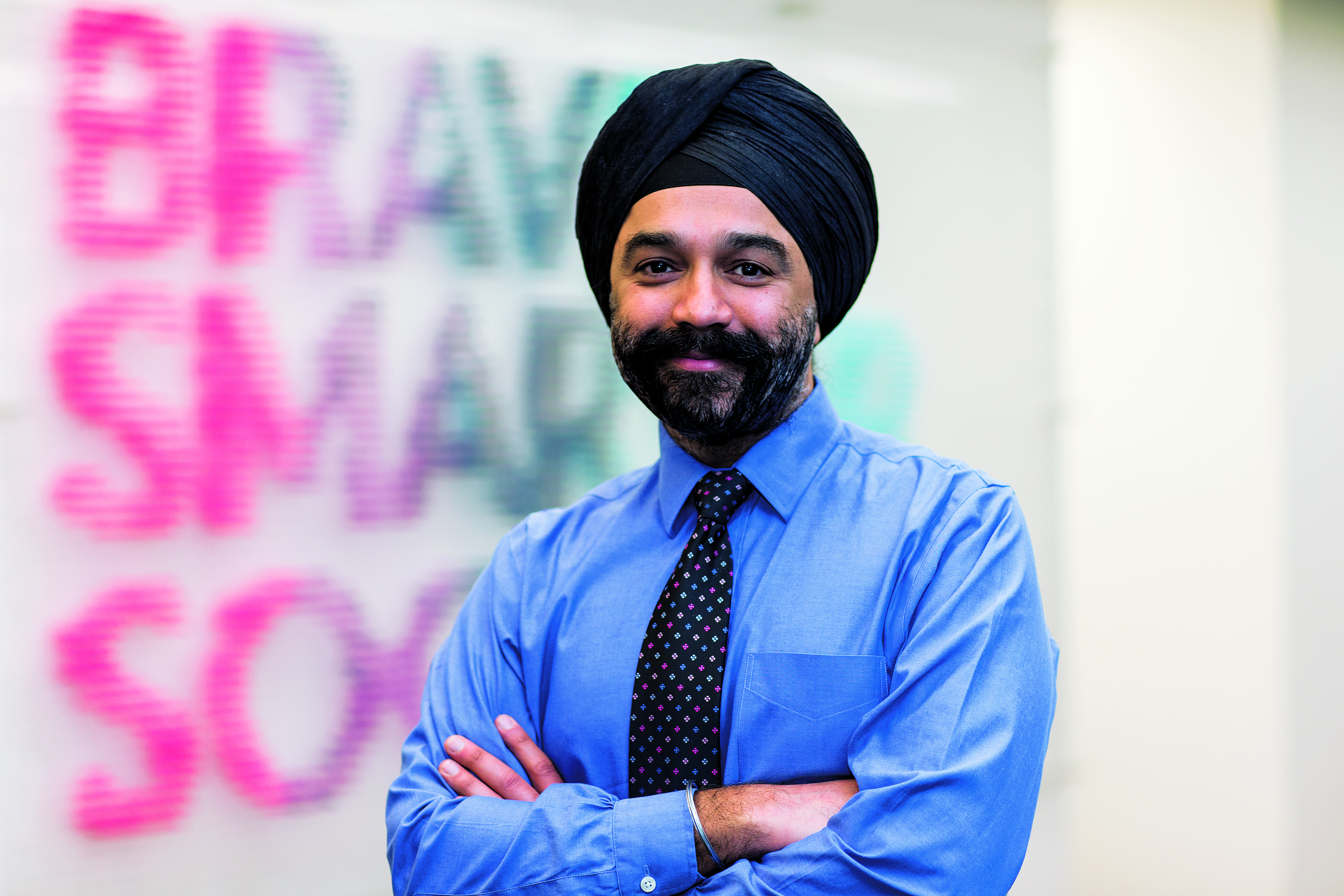
- Kumar in 2014
- Born: Harpal Singh Kumar; 1965 (age 60–61)
- Education: St John's College, Cambridge; Harvard Business School

Sir Harpal Singh Kumar (born 1965) is a British medical researcher of Indian descent who is president of GRAIL Europe. He was chief executive officer of Cancer Research UK from April 2008 until June 2018, and then senior vice president and head of innovation EMEA at Johnson & Johnson until April 2020.

== Early life ==
Kumar's parents were refugees. As Sikhs, they chose to leave what was to become Pakistan and move to India during the Partition of India in 1947, where they ended up in refugee camps. Later they moved to England from India, where his father was employed sweeping factory floors, before eventually starting his own grocery store.

Kumar attended Latymer Upper School in Hammersmith before taking up a place to study chemical engineering at the University of Cambridge. He graduated with Master of Engineering and Master of Arts degrees and was awarded the Mobil Prize, Metal Box Prize, and Hughes Prize during his time at Cambridge. He subsequently gained a Master of Business Administration degree with high distinction as a Baker Scholar at Harvard Business School where he won the Ford Prize and the Wolfe Prize.

== Career ==
After graduation, Kumar was employed by McKinsey and Co. as a healthcare consultant. In 1992 he was appointed chief executive of the disability charity the Papworth Trust. In 1997 he founded Nexan Group, a venture capital-backed medical devices company.

Kumar joined Cancer Research Technology Limited (the commercialisation arm of Cancer Research UK) as chief executive in 2002, and took on the additional role of chief operating officer of Cancer Research UK in 2004. He became chief executive officer in April 2007 and led the charity for more than a decade before departing in 2018.

From 2018 to 2020, Kumar was head of EMEA at Johnson & Johnson Innovation. In April 2020, he was appointed president of GRAIL Europe by GRAIL Inc.

Kumar's non-executive roles have included serving as a trustee of the Francis Crick Institute and the Institute of Cancer Research, and a senior independent member of the council of Innovate UK. He has served on the boards of the National Cancer Research Institute (as chair), the Cancer Outcomes Strategy Advisory Group in England (as chair), the National Awareness and Early Diagnosis Initiative (as co-chair), and UK Research and Innovation.

== Awards and honours ==
Kumar was knighted in the 2016 New Year Honours for services to cancer research.

== Personal life ==
Kumar is a British Indian, a British Punjabi and a British Sikh.

Kumar lists his recreations as theatre, opera and football.
