= Alternative Therapies in Health and Medicine =

Alternative medicine journal

- Discipline: Alternative medicine
- Language: English
- Edited by: Andrew W. Campbell

Publication details
- History: 1995-present
- Publisher: InnoVision Health Media
- Frequency: Bimonthly
- Impact factor: 1.305 (2020)

Standard abbreviations
- ISO 4: Altern. Ther. Health Med.

Indexing
- CODEN: ATHMF7
- ISSN: 1078-6791
- LCCN: 96641274
- OCLC no.: 61311563

Links
- Journal homepage; Online archive

Alternative Therapies in Health and Medicine is a bimonthly peer-reviewed medical journal covering alternative medical treatments. It publishes case reports, original research papers, and systematic reviews. It was established in 1995 by founding editor Larry Dossey, and is published bimonthly by InnoVision Health Media. The editor-in-chief since 2013 is Andrew W. Campbell.

== Founding and content ==
When it launched, it was one of several journals about alternative medicine that were aimed primarily at doctors. It and similar journals carried advertisements for "unproven homeopathic products, shark cartilage, naturopathic remedies and other health food store items oriented toward cancer." David Gorski on the website Science-Based Medicine observed that United States Senator Tom Harkin (who was instrumental in drafting the legislation that funded the Office of Alternative Medicine but later criticized the self-same office's reliance on evidence-based testing) wrote two different commentaries in the journal's inaugural issue. He wrote:

In these two articles, Harkin basically introduced the new journal as a "journey—an exploration into what has been called 'left-out medicine,' therapies that show promise but that have not yet been accepted into the mainstream of modern medicine." and explicitly stated that "mainstreaming alternative practices that work is our next step." Unfortunately, he had a bit of a problem with the way medical science goes about determining whether a health practice—any health practice—works and railed against what he characterized as the "unbendable rules of randomized clinical trials." Citing his use of bee pollen to treat his allergies, went on to assert, "It is not necessary for the scientific community to understand the process before the American public can benefit from these therapies...."

... Truly, this was a profound misunderstanding of how science works.

Elsewhere on the website, Jann Bellamy, Florida attorney and founding member of the Institute for Science in Medicine, described the journal as being "of dubious scientific rigor".

== Staff ==
The journal's founding editor-in-chief was Larry Dossey. In 2004, Mark Hyman was appointed as chief editor. In November 2008 David Riley, the journal's former medical editor, was appointed to the role. The editorial staff changed in 2010, leading the editorial board to resign; their names remained on the masthead as of 2013. As of 2013, the editor-in-chief was Andrew W. Campbell, and the journal's website listed him as practicing medicine in Texas; in 2011, he was barred from practicing medicine in Texas and was apparently practicing in Florida. The Texas Medical Board had taken repeated action against Campbell because he "relied on junk science, ordered inappropriate tests, and improperly diagnosed 'toxigenic mold exposure.'"

== Abstracting and indexing ==
The journal is abstracted and indexed in Current Contents/Clinical Medicine, Index Medicus/MEDLINE/PubMed, Science Citation Index Expanded, and Scopus. According to the Journal Citation Reports, the journal has a 2015 impact factor of 1.329.
