= Direct-to-consumer blood testing =

Describes a new class of consumer health testing

Direct-to-consumer blood testing (DTC blood testing), also known as direct access testing (DAT), is a form of laboratory testing that allows consumers to order blood tests directly from a clinical laboratory without requiring a prescription or referral from a physician. This market has grown significantly in recent years, driven by consumer interest in personalized health management, advances in laboratory technology, and regulatory changes that have expanded access in many jurisdictions.

These services typically offer comprehensive metabolic panels, lipid profiles, hormone testing, nutritional markers, and increasingly sophisticated biomarker assessments that were traditionally only available through healthcare providers. Over the last decade, a paradigm shift has taken place with consumers seeking greater involvement in decisions affecting their healthcare and with policies that enable this involvement.

== Market overview and analysis ==
=== Industry growth ===
The global blood testing market was valued at approximately USD 96.62 billion in 2024 and is projected to reach USD 160.50 billion by 2030, growing at a compound annual growth rate (CAGR) of 8.83%. The DTC segment represents a rapidly growing portion of this market, fueled by increasing consumer health awareness and technological innovations in sample collection and analysis.

North America dominates the market with the largest revenue share (approximately 44.83% in 2024), driven by well-established healthcare infrastructure, favorable regulatory environments in many states, and high consumer acceptance of self-directed healthcare services.

=== Key market drivers ===
- Consumer empowerment: Growing interest in preventive healthcare and personal health optimization has driven demand for accessible testing options.
- Technological advances: Innovations in sample collection (including at-home blood collection with minimal blood volume requirements) and point-of-care testing have made DTC testing more convenient and accessible.
- Chronic disease prevalence: Rising rates of diabetes (affecting 37.3 million Americans according to the CDC), cardiovascular disease, and other chronic conditions have increased demand for regular monitoring.
- Cost transparency: DTC services often provide upfront pricing, contrasting with the often opaque costs of traditional healthcare-ordered testing.

== Regulatory landscape ==
=== Federal regulation ===
Laboratory testing in the United States is subject to federal regulation. Clinical laboratories performing testing are overseen by the Centers for Medicare and Medicaid Services (CMS) utilizing national standards established under the Clinical Laboratory Improvement Amendments (CLIA). The Centers for Disease Control and Prevention (CDC) and the Food and Drug Administration (FDA) assist CMS in this process.

==== Clinical Laboratory Improvement Amendments (CLIA) ====
CMS ensures the integrity of laboratories performing testing via inspections and consistent oversight, bolstered with proficiency testing by accredited organizations. CLIA authorizes regulation of laboratories that conduct testing, not the individuals who order the tests or receive test results. All laboratories performing DTC testing must obtain CLIA certification and maintain compliance with national standards.

==== Food and Drug Administration (FDA) ====
The FDA reviews commercially available test kits and their associated medical claims to ensure safety and efficacy before products are cleared or approved for use. The regulatory landscape for laboratory developed tests (LDTs) has been evolving significantly.

On May 6, 2024, the FDA issued a final rule significantly modifying its approach to oversight of laboratory-developed tests, amending regulations to clarify that in vitro diagnostic products (IVDs) are devices under the Federal Food, Drug, and Cosmetic Act, including when manufactured by a laboratory. The final rule includes a policy under which FDA would phase out enforcement discretion for LDTs over a four-year period.

The phaseout policy consists of five stages, starting May 6, 2024. DTC tests are specifically noted as having never been subject to enforcement discretion, meaning compliance with FDA requirements has always been expected for consumer-facing diagnostic tests.

However, on April 17, 2025, a federal court blocked FDA's final rule on LDTs, creating uncertainty about the regulatory future. LDTs continue to be governed by CMS under CLIA oversight, but the long-term regulatory framework remains unsettled.

==== Federal Trade Commission (FTC) ====
The Federal Trade Commission monitors the DTC testing market for deceptive marketing strategies and unsubstantiated claims, taking action against companies that make misleading representations about test accuracy, interpretation, or health benefits.

=== State-level regulation ===
State laws significantly influence the availability and scope of DTC testing services. Federal regulations require the laboratory to have a "written or electronic request for patient testing from an authorized person," but the regulations do not define "authorized person." Thus it is up to each state to determine who is an authorized person.

- Direct Access Testing (DAT) states: Currently, 37 states and the District of Columbia permit consumers to order some or all of their laboratory tests directly, without the involvement of a physician.
- Restrictive states: States including New Hampshire, Pennsylvania, Rhode Island, and certain aspects of New York law maintain more restrictive policies.
- Limited access states: Some states like Maine and Massachusetts allow direct reporting to consumers only for a limited menu of tests.

== Impact of COVID-19 ==
The COVID-19 pandemic fundamentally transformed the diagnostic testing landscape and accelerated trends in the DTC blood testing industry.

=== Accelerated consumer adoption ===
The pandemic dramatically increased public awareness of diagnostic testing and normalized at-home health monitoring. Self-testing kits for COVID-19 familiarized millions of consumers with the concept of collecting samples at home, reducing barriers to adoption of other DTC testing services. The blood sample segment dominated the self-testing market with approximately 35.19% revenue share in 2024.

=== Regulatory flexibility ===
Emergency regulatory pathways created during the pandemic demonstrated the potential for more flexible oversight frameworks. The FDA's Emergency Use Authorizations for COVID-19 tests expanded point-of-care and over-the-counter testing options, establishing precedents that may influence future regulatory approaches for other diagnostic tests.

=== Supply chain and operational impacts ===
The pandemic initially disrupted blood donation and collection services due to lockdowns and social distancing requirements. However, it also spurred innovation in contactless and at-home collection methods, with companies developing low-volume sample collection technologies that require as little as 1 mL of blood compared to traditional testing requiring 50-130 mL.

=== Telemedicine integration ===
The rapid expansion of telemedicine during COVID-19 created natural synergies with DTC testing, enabling remote consultation for test result interpretation and follow-up care.

== Professional organization positions ==
=== Association for Diagnostics and Laboratory Medicine (ADLM) ===
ADLM (formerly the American Association for Clinical Chemistry) supports expanding and encouraging consumers' ability to access their own health information by allowing individuals to directly order their own laboratory tests. Key positions include: only reputable CLIA-certified laboratories should perform DTC testing; laboratories must validate all sample collection, processing, and testing practices per CLIA regulations; transparent, understandable information must be provided regarding clinical indications, specimen collection, results interpretation, and cost.

=== American Society for Clinical Pathology (ASCP) ===
ASCP believes that it is important for physicians and patients to use the test results as a mechanism to discuss a variety of health topics. Key ASCP recommendations include: laboratories should follow applicable state laws regarding direct access testing; laboratories should inform patients about restrictions in insurance and medical coverage; patients should consult with their primary care physician whenever possible after receiving DAT test results.

=== American Hospital Association (AHA) ===
The American Hospital Association has expressed concern that FDA's proposal to classify LDTs as medical devices exceeds the agency's appropriate regulatory scope, urging the FDA to continue to apply its enforcement discretion to hospital and health system LDTs and defer regulation of these tests mainly to CMS's strict CLIA oversight, the CAP accreditation and state law. The organization has called on Congress to either exclude hospitals and health systems from this device classification framework or to modernize LDT oversight in a way that promotes innovation while maintaining test accessibility, safety, and effectiveness.

== Benefits and concerns ==
=== Potential benefits ===
- Increased health awareness: Regular testing can help individuals identify health trends and potential issues early, enabling proactive health management.
- Convenience and accessibility: At-home collection and direct ordering eliminate barriers such as scheduling appointments, obtaining referrals, and taking time off work.
- Cost transparency: Upfront pricing allows consumers to make informed decisions about testing costs.
- Patient empowerment: Direct access to health data supports informed decision-making and engagement in personal health management. In 2014 the federal government issued a regulation directing clinical laboratories to provide individuals with access to their test data upon request.

=== Potential concerns ===
- Interpretation challenges: Complex laboratory results require proper context and clinical expertise to interpret correctly. Misinterpretation may lead to unnecessary anxiety or inappropriate self-treatment.
- Insurance coverage: Self-directed laboratory testing is not covered by health insurance; insurers generally pay only for tests ordered under the authorization of a physician.
- Care fragmentation: Testing conducted outside the patient-provider relationship may not be integrated into medical records or coordinated with ongoing care.

== Market comparison ==
The following table compares biomarkers and services offered by major DTC blood testing providers as of November 2025.

| Biomarker/Test | HealthieOne Complete | Function Health | Vitals Vault Max | Mito Health | Empirical Health | Superpower Advanced | Marek Diagnostics |
HEART / CARDIOVASCULAR HEALTH
| Apolipoprotein B (ApoB) | ✓ | ✓ | Advanced/Max | ✓ | ✓ | ✓ | ✓ |
| HDL Cholesterol | ✓ | ✓ | ✓ | ✓ | ✓ | ✓ | ✓ |
| Lipoprotein (a) | ✓ | ✓ | Advanced/Max | ✓ | ✓ | Add-on: $159 | Complete: $895 |
| CRP | ✓ | ✓ | ✓ | ✓ | ✓ | ✓ | ✓ |
| LDL Cholesterol | ✓ | ✓ | ✓ | ✓ | ✓ | ✓ | ✓ |
| Non-HDL Cholesterol | ✓ | ✓ | ✓ | ✓ | ✓ | ✓ | |
| Total Cholesterol | ✓ | ✓ | ✓ | ✓ | ✓ | ✓ | ✓ |
| Total Cholesterol / HDL Ratio | ✓ | ✓ | ✓ | | ✓ | ✓ | |
| Triglycerides | ✓ | ✓ | ✓ | ✓ | ✓ | ✓ | ✓ |
| LDL Medium* | | ✓ | | | | | |
| LDL Particle Number* | | ✓ | | | | Add-on: $189 | |
| LDL Pattern* | | ✓ | | | | | |
| LDL Peak Size* | | ✓ | | | | Add-on: $189 | |
| LDL Small* | | ✓ | | | | Add-on: $189 | |
| HDL Size* | | | | | | Add-on: $189 | |
| HDL Large* | | ✓ | | | | Add-on: $189 | |
| HDL P* | | | | | | Add-on: $189 | |
| Large VLDL P* | | | | | | Add-on: $189 | |
| VLDL Size* | | | | | | ✓ | |
| Apolipoprotein A1 | ✓ | Add-on | Max | | ✓ | | |
| Apolipoprotein B/Apolipoprotein A1 | ✓ | Add-on | | | ✓ | | |
| Trimethylamine N-Oxide | ✓ | Add-on | | | | | Executive: $1950 |
| Triglyceride/HDL Ratio | ✓ | | ✓ | ✓ | | ✓ | |
| Triglyceride/ApoB Ratio | ✓ | | | | | ✓ | |
| Non-HDL/Total Cholesterol Ratio | ✓ | | ✓ | | ✓ | ✓ | |
| Non-HDL/ApoB Ratio | ✓ | | | | | ✓ | |
| LDL/HDL Ratio | ✓ | | ✓ | | ✓ | ✓ | ✓ |
| LDL-c/ApoB Ratio | ✓ | | Advanced/Max | | | ✓ | |
| LDL-c/Cholesterol total | ✓ | | | | ✓ | ✓ | |
| Neutrophil-to-HDL Cholesterol Ratio | ✓ | | | | | ✓ | |
| Atherogenic Index | ✓ | | | | | ✓ | |
| Atherogenic Coefficient | ✓ | | | | | ✓ | |
| Cholesterol VLDL | ✓ | | Max | | | | ✓ |
| Remnant Cholesterol | ✓ | | | | | | |
| Asymmetric Dimethylarginine | ✓ | | | | | Add-on: $159 | |
| Epinephrine | ✓ | | | | | | |
| Arginine | ✓ | | | | | | |
| Arginine/ADMA Ratio | ✓ | | | | | | |
| Taurine | ✓ | | | | | | |
| Aldosterone | ✓ | | | | | | |
THYROID
| Thyroxine (T4) | ✓ | ✓ (T4 Free) | ✓ (T4 Free) | ✓ (T4 Free) | ✓ (T4 Free) | ✓ (T4 Free) and T4 Total | ✓ (T4 Free) |
| Triiodothyronine (T3) | ✓ | ✓ (T3 Free) | ✓ (T3 Uptake) | ✓ (T3 Free) | | ✓ (T3 Uptake) | ✓ (T3 Free) |
| Free T3:Free T4 Ratio | | | Max | | | | |
| Thyroglobulin Antibodies (TgAb) | | ✓ | | | | Add-on: $139 | Complete: $895 |
| Thyroid Peroxidase Antibodies (TPO) | | ✓ | | | | Add-on: $139 | Complete: $895 |
| Thyroid-Stimulating Hormone (TSH) | | ✓ | ✓ | | ✓ | ✓ | ✓ |
| TRAb | | ✓ | | | | | |
| Thiocyanate | ✓ | | | | | | |
| Cyclic adenosine monophosphate | ✓ | | | | | | |
| Tyrosine | ✓ | | | | | | |
AUTOIMMUNITY / IMMUNE HEALTH
| Rheumatoid Factor (RF) | ✓ | ✓ | | | | Add-on: $139 | |
| Basophils | ✓ | ✓ | ✓ | ✓ | | ✓ | ✓ |
| Eosinophils | ✓ | ✓ | ✓ | ✓ | | ✓ | ✓ |
| Lymphocytes | ✓ | ✓ | ✓ | ✓ | | ✓ | ✓ |
| Monocytes | ✓ | ✓ | ✓ | ✓ | | ✓ | ✓ |
| Neutrophils | ✓ | ✓ | ✓ | ✓ | | ✓ | ✓ |
| White Blood Cell Count | ✓ | ✓ | ✓ | ✓ | ✓ | ✓ | ✓ |
| ANA Pattern** | | ✓ | | | | | |
| ANA Screen** | | ✓ | | | | Add-on: $139 | |
| ANA Titer** | | ✓ | | | | | |
| IgA | ✓ | Add-on | | | | | |
| IgG | ✓ | Add-on | | | | | |
| IgM | ✓ | Add-on | | | | | |
| Ferritin/CRP Ratio | ✓ | | ✓ | | | | |
| CRP/Albumin Ratio (CAR) | ✓ | | ✓ | | | ✓ | |
| Lymphocyte-to-Monocyte Ratio (LMR) | ✓ | | ✓ | | | ✓ | |
| Monocyte-to-Lymphocyte Ratio (MLR) | ✓ | | ✓ | | | ✓ | |
| Neutrophil-to-Lymphocyte & Platelet Ratio (NLPR) | ✓ | | ✓ | | | ✓ | |
| Neutrophil-to-Lymphocyte Ratio (NLR) | ✓ | | ✓ | | | ✓ | ✓ |
| Platelet/Lymphocyte | ✓ | | ✓ | | | ✓ | |
| Platelet-to-WBC Ratio | ✓ | | | | | ✓ | |
| Systemic Immune-Inflammation Index (SII) | ✓ | | ✓ | | | ✓ | |
| Systemic Inflammation Response Index (SIRI) | ✓ | | ✓ | | | ✓ | |
| Aggregate Index of Systemic Inflammation (AISI) | ✓ | | | | | | |
| Monocyte-to-HDL Ratio | ✓ | | | | | ✓ | ✓ |
| Erythrocyte Sedimentation Rate (ESR) | | | ✓ | ✓ | | ✓ | |
| Eosinophils % | ✓ | | ✓ | | ✓ | ✓ | ✓ |
| Neutrophils % | ✓ | | ✓ | ✓ | ✓ | ✓ | ✓ |
| Basophils % | ✓ | | ✓ | | ✓ | ✓ | ✓ |
| Lymphocytes % | ✓ | | ✓ | | ✓ | ✓ | ✓ |
| Monocytes % | ✓ | | ✓ | | ✓ | ✓ | ✓ |
| Band Neutrophils % | | | ✓ | | Advanced | | |
| Leukocyte Esterase | | | | | Advanced | | |
| Immature granulocytes (IG) | ✓ | | | | | | ✓ |
| Immature granulocytes % (IG%) | ✓ | | | | | | ✓ |
| Histamine | ✓ | | | | | | |
BLOOD HEALTH
| ABO Group and Rhesus (Rh) Factor | | ✓ | | | | | |
| Hematocrit | ✓ | ✓ | ✓ | ✓ | ✓ | ✓ | ✓ |
| Hemoglobin | ✓ | ✓ | ✓ | ✓ | ✓ | ✓ | ✓ |
| MCH | ✓ | ✓ | ✓ | ✓ | ✓ | ✓ | ✓ |
| MCHC | ✓ | ✓ | ✓ | ✓ | ✓ | ✓ | ✓ |
| MCV | ✓ | ✓ | ✓ | ✓ | ✓ | ✓ | ✓ |
| MPV | ✓ | ✓ | ✓ | | ✓ | ✓ | |
| Platelet Count | ✓ | ✓ | ✓ | ✓ | ✓ | ✓ | ✓ |
| Red Blood Cell Count | ✓ | ✓ | ✓ | ✓ | ✓ | ✓ | ✓ |
| Nucleated RBC | | | ✓ | | | | ✓ |
| Promyelocytes | | | ✓ | | | | |
| Myelocytes | | | ✓ | | | | |
| Metamyelocytes | | | ✓ | | | | |
| Blast | | | ✓ | | | | |
| RDW/MCV | ✓ | | | | | ✓ | |
| Reticulocytes % | ✓ | | | | | | |
| RDW-CV | ✓ | ✓ | ✓ | ✓ | ✓ | ✓ | ✓ |
| Red Cell Distribution Width-SD (RDW-SD) | ✓ | | | | | | |
| Reticulocytes | ✓ | | | | | | Complete: $895 |
| IRF | ✓ | | | | | | |
| RET-He | ✓ | | | | | | |
FEMALE / MALE HEALTH
| DHEA-Sulfate | ✓ | ✓ | Advanced/Max | ✓ | | ✓ | ✓ |
| Estradiol | ✓ | ✓ | Advanced/Max | ✓ | | ✓ | ✓ |
| Testosterone | ✓ | ✓ | Advanced/Max | ✓ | | ✓ | ✓ |
| Testosterone/CRP Ratio | ✓ | | ✓ | | | | |
| Testosterone/Estradiol (T:E2) | ✓ | | Advanced/Max | | | ✓ | |
| Testosterone/ApoB Ratio | ✓ | | ✓ | | | | |
| Free Testosterone | | ✓ | Advanced/Max | ✓ | | ✓ | ✓ |
| Free Testosterone:Cortisol ratio | | | | ✓ | | | |
| % Testosterone Free | | | Advanced/Max | | | ✓ | Executive: $1950 |
| Testosterone Bioavailable | | | Advanced/Max | | | ✓ | |
| % Testosterone Bioavailable | | | Advanced/Max | | | ✓ | |
| Anti-Mullerian Hormone | | ✓ | | | | Add-on: $159 | Complete: $895 |
| FSH | | ✓ | ✓ | ✓ | | Add-on: $189 | ✓ |
| LH | | ✓ | ✓ | ✓ | | Add-on: $189 | ✓ |
| Pregnancy (hCG) | | Add-on | | | | | ✓ |
| Prolactin | | ✓ | | ✓ | | Add-on: $189 | ✓ |
| SHBG | | ✓ | ✓ | ✓ | | ✓ | ✓ |
| Free Androgen Index (FAI) | | | | | | ✓ | |
| PSA | | ✓ | Max | ✓ | | Add-on: $189 | ✓ |
| IGF-1 | | Add-on | Max | ✓ | | Add-on: $189 | ✓ |
| Androstenedione | ✓ | Add-on | | | | | |
| Dehydroepiandrosterone | ✓ | | | | | | Add-on: $150 |
| DHT | ✓ | Add-on | | | | | |
| Androsterone | ✓ | | | | | | |
| 17-Hydroxypregnenolone | ✓ | | | | | | |
| 17-Hydroxyprogesterone | ✓ | | | | | Add-on: $159 | Complete: $895 |
| Pregnenolone | ✓ | | | | | | Complete: $895 |
| Progesterone | ✓ | | Max | ✓ | | Add-on: $189 | ✓ |
| Estriol | ✓ | | | | | | |
| Estrone | ✓ | | | | | | |
METABOLIC / GLUCOSE & ENERGY
| Glucose | ✓ | ✓ | ✓ | ✓ | ✓ | ✓ | ✓ |
| Hemoglobin A1c (HbA1c) | ✓ | ✓ | ✓ | ✓ | ✓ | ✓ | ✓ |
| Uric Acid | ✓ | ✓ | ✓ | ✓ | | ✓ | Complete: $895 |
| Uric Acid / HDL-C | ✓ | | | | | ✓ | |
| Insulin | | ✓ | Advanced/Max | ✓ | | Add-on: $189 | ✓ |
| Leptin | | ✓ | | | | Add-on: $129 | |
| Glycation Gap | | | ✓ | | | | |
| LDH | | | Max | ✓ | | | |
| Insulin Resistance Screening | ✓ | | ✓ | | | ✓ | |
| TyG-BMI Index | ✓ | | ✓ | | | | |
| METS-IR | ✓ | | | | | | |
| eAG (mg/dl) | | | | | | | |
| eAG (mmol/L) | | | | | | | |
| HOMA2-%B | | | ✓ | | | | |
| HOMA2-%S | | | ✓ | | | | |
| HOMA2-IR | | | ✓ | ✓ | | | |
| QUICKI | | | Advanced/Max | | | | |
| Galactose | ✓ | | | | | | |
| Citric acid | ✓ | | | | | | |
| Malic acid | ✓ | | | | | | |
| Succinic acid | ✓ | | | | | | |
| 2-Ketoglutaric acid | ✓ | | | | | | |
| 2-Hydroxyglutarate | ✓ | | | | | | |
| Cis-Aconitic acid | ✓ | | | | | | |
| AMP | ✓ | | | | | | |
| ADP | ✓ | | | | | | |
| GMP | ✓ | | | | | | |
| GDP | ✓ | | | | | | |
| Glucose-6-phosphate | ✓ | | | | | | |
| Pyruvate | ✓ | | | | | | |
| 1,5-Anhydroglucitol | ✓ | | | | | | |
| Alanine | ✓ | | | | | | |
| Lactate | ✓ | | | | | | |
| Adenine | ✓ | | | | | | |
| Aspartate | ✓ | | | | | | |
| Dimethylglycine | ✓ | | | | | | |
| Guanosine | ✓ | | | | | | |
| Uridine | ✓ | | | | | | |
| Uridine diphosphate | ✓ | | | | | | |
| Fumaric acid | ✓ | | | | | | |
NUTRIENTS / VITAMINS & MINERALS
| Arachidonic Acid/EPA Ratio | ✓ | ✓ | | | | ✓ | |
| EPA/Arachidonic Acid Ratio | ✓ | | | | | | |
| Calcium | ✓ | ✓ | ✓ | ✓ | ✓ | ✓ | |
| Ferritin | ✓ | ✓ | ✓ | ✓ | ✓ | ✓ | ✓ |
| Homocysteine | ✓ | ✓ | Advanced/Max | ✓ | | Add-on: $169 | Complete: $895 |
| Iron | ✓ | ✓ | ✓ | ✓ | ✓ | ✓ | ✓ |
| Iron % Saturation | ✓ | ✓ | ✓ | ✓ | ✓ | ✓ | ✓ |
| Iron Binding Capacity | ✓ | ✓ | ✓ | ✓ | ✓ | ✓ | ✓ |
| Magnesium | ✓ | ✓ | Advanced/Max | ✓ | | Add-on: $159 | Complete: $895 |
| Methylmalonic Acid | ✓ | Add-on | | | | Add-on: $169 | |
| Omega-3: DHA | ✓ | ✓ | | | | | |
| Omega-3: DPA | ✓ | ✓ | | | | | |
| Omega-3: EPA | ✓ | ✓ | | | | | |
| Omega-6 / Omega-3 Ratio | | ✓ | | | | | |
| Omega-6 Total | | ✓ | | | | | |
| Omega-3 Total | | ✓ | | | | | |
| Omega-6: Arachidonic Acid | ✓ | ✓ | | | | | |
| Omega-6: Linoleic Acid | ✓ | ✓ | | | | | |
| Vitamin D | ✓ | ✓ | ✓ | ✓ | ✓ | ✓ | ✓ |
| Zinc | | ✓ | | | | | Executive: $1950 |
| Vitamin B12 | | Add-on | Advanced/Max | ✓ | ✓ | Add-on: $169 | Complete: $895 |
| Corrected Calcium | ✓ | | Advanced/Max | ✓ | | ✓ | |
| Ferritin-to-Albumin Ratio (FAR) | ✓ | | Advanced/Max | | | ✓ | |
| Oleic acid | ✓ | | | | | | |
| Capric acid | ✓ | | | | | | |
| Gamma-Linolenic Acid | ✓ | | | | | | |
| Homo-Gamma-Linolenic acid | ✓ | | | | | | |
| Vaccenic Acid | ✓ | | | | | | |
| Glutarylcarnitine | ✓ | | | | | | |
| Propionylcarnitine | ✓ | | | | | | |
| Docosanoic Acid | ✓ | | | | | | |
| Octanoic acid | ✓ | | | | | | |
| Carnitine | ✓ | | | | | | |
| Choline | ✓ | | | | | | |
| Vitamin A | ✓ | Add-on | | | | Add-on: $159 | |
| Vitamin B1 | ✓ | | | | | | |
| Vitamin B2 | ✓ | | | | | Add-on: $169 | |
| Vitamin B5 | ✓ | | | | | | |
| Vitamin E | ✓ | | | | | Add-on: $159 | |
| Ascorbic acid | ✓ | | | | | Add-on: $159 | |
| Folate | ✓ | Add-on | Advanced/Max | ✓ | ✓ | Add-on: $169 | Complete: $895 |
| Nicotinic acid (Vitamin B3) | ✓ | | | | | | |
| 5-Methyltetrahydrofolate | ✓ | | | | | | |
| Vitamin K1 | ✓ | | | | | Add-on: $159 | |
| Vitamin B6 | ✓ | | | | | Add-on: $169 | |
| Biotin | ✓ | | | | | | |
| Nicotinamide | ✓ | | | | | | |
| Phosphorus | ✓ | | | | | | |
| Pyridoxal-5'-phosphate | ✓ | | | | | | |
| Transferrin | ✓ | | | | | | ✓ |
| UIBC | ✓ | | | ✓ | | | ✓ |
| Creatine | ✓ | | | | | | |
HEAVY METALS
| Lead | | ✓ | | | | | |
| Mercury | | ✓ | | ✓ | | | |
STRESS / AGING / LONGEVITY
| Cortisol | ✓ | ✓ | Max | ✓ | | ✓ | ✓ |
| Cortisol:DHEA-S Ratio | ✓ | | Advanced/Max | ✓ | | | |
| Corticosterone | ✓ | | | | | | |
| Cortisone | ✓ | | | | | | |
| 11-Deoxycortisol | ✓ | | | | | | |
| 21-Deoxycortisol | ✓ | | | | | | |
| Guanine | ✓ | | | | | | |
| Metanephrine | ✓ | | | | | | |
| Deoxyinosine | ✓ | | | | | | |
| Kynurenine | ✓ | | | | | | |
| Tryptophan | ✓ | | | | | | |
LIVER & PANCREAS HEALTH
| ALT | ✓ | ✓ | ✓ | ✓ | ✓ | ✓ | ✓ |
| Albumin | ✓ | ✓ | ✓ | ✓ | ✓ | ✓ | ✓ |
| Albumin / Globulin Ratio | ✓ | ✓ | ✓ | | ✓ | ✓ | ✓ |
| ALP | ✓ | ✓ | ✓ | ✓ | ✓ | ✓ | ✓ |
| AST | ✓ | ✓ | ✓ | ✓ | ✓ | ✓ | ✓ |
| GGT | ✓ | ✓ | Advanced/Max | ✓ | | ✓ | ✓ |
| Globulin | ✓ | ✓ | ✓ | | ✓ | ✓ | ✓ |
| Total Bilirubin | ✓ | ✓ | ✓ | ✓ | ✓ | ✓ | ✓ |
| Bilirubin, Direct | | | | ✓ | | ✓ | |
| Bilirubin, Indirect | | | | ✓ | | ✓ | |
| FIB-4 | ✓ | | | ✓ | | | |
| I/D Bilirubin Ratio | | | Max | | | ✓ | |
| Total Protein | ✓ | ✓ | ✓ | ✓ | ✓ | ✓ | ✓ |
| Amylase | ✓ | ✓ | Max | ✓ | | | ✓ |
| Lipase | ✓ | ✓ | Max | ✓ | | | Executive: $1950 |
| GGT/HDL Ratio | ✓ | | Advanced/Max | | | ✓ | |
| BAR | ✓ | | ✓ | | | ✓ | |
| AST:ALT Ratio | ✓ | | ✓ | | ✓ | | |
| Chenodeoxycholic acid | ✓ | | | | | | |
| Cholic acid | ✓ | | | | | | |
| Deoxycholic acid | ✓ | | | | | | |
| Glycochenodeoxycholic acid | ✓ | | | | | | |
| Glycocholic acid | ✓ | | | | | | |
| Glycodeoxycholic acid | ✓ | | | | | | |
| Glycolithocholic acid | ✓ | | | | | | |
| Glycoursodeoxycholic acid | ✓ | | | | | | |
| Lithocholic acid | ✓ | | | | | | |
| Taurochenodeoxycholic acid | ✓ | | | | | | |
| Taurocholic acid | ✓ | | | | | | |
| Taurodeoxycholic acid | ✓ | | | | | | |
| Taurolithocholic acid | ✓ | | | | | | |
| Tauroursodeoxycholic acid | ✓ | | | | | | |
| Ursodeoxycholic acid | ✓ | | | | | | |
| Aminolevulinic acid | ✓ | | | | | | |
| Coproporphyrin I | ✓ | | | | | | |
| Coproporphyrin III | ✓ | | | | | | |
| Protoporphyrin IX | ✓ | | | | | | |
| Glycerol | ✓ | | | | | | |
| Phenylalanine | ✓ | | | | | | |
KIDNEY HEALTH
| Blood Urea Nitrogen | ✓ | ✓ | ✓ | ✓ | ✓ | ✓ | ✓ |
| BUN / Creatinine Ratio | ✓ | ✓ | ✓ | ✓ | ✓ | ✓ | ✓ |
| Chloride | | ✓ | ✓ | ✓ | ✓ | ✓ | ✓ |
| Creatinine | ✓ | ✓ | ✓ | ✓ | ✓ | ✓ | ✓ |
| eGFR | ✓ | ✓ | ✓ | ✓ | | ✓ | ✓ |
| Potassium*** | | ✓ | ✓ | ✓ | ✓ | ✓ | ✓ |
| Sodium*** | | ✓ | ✓ | ✓ | ✓ | ✓ | ✓ |
| Carbon Dioxide*** | | ✓ | ✓ | ✓ | ✓ | ✓ | ✓ |
| Anion Gap*** | | | ✓ | | | | |
| Serum Osmolality | | | | ✓ | | | |
| Sodium:Potassium Ratio | | | ✓ | | | | |
| Cystatin-C | | | | | | | Complete: $895 |
| Xanthine | ✓ | | | | | | |
| Guanidinoacetate | ✓ | | | | | | |
| Cystine | ✓ | | | | | | |
| CK | ✓ | | | | | ✓ | ✓ |
| Hippuric acid | ✓ | | | | | | |
| Uric Acid/Creatinine Ratio | ✓ | | | | | | |
NEUROLOGICAL HEALTH
| Serotonin | ✓ | | | | | | |
| GABA | ✓ | | | | | | |
| Norepinephrine | ✓ | | | | | | |
| Melatonin | ✓ | | | | | | |
| 3-O-Methyldopa | ✓ | | | | | | |
| N-Acetylaspartic acid | ✓ | | | | | | |
| N-Acetylaspartylglutamic acid | ✓ | | | | | | |
| Kynurenic acid | ✓ | | | | | | |
| Phosphoserine | ✓ | | | | | | |
| Pipecolic Acid | ✓ | | | | | | |
| DOPA | ✓ | | | | | | |
ANTIOXIDANT LEVELS
| 1-Methylhistidine | ✓ | | | | | | |
| Anserine | ✓ | | | | | | |
| Cystathionine | ✓ | | | | | | |
| Carnosine | ✓ | | | | | | |
| Methionine | ✓ | | | | | | |
| Cysteine | ✓ | | | | | | |
| Indole-3-propionate | ✓ | | | | | | |
| Glutathione reduced | ✓ | | | | | | |
KETONE BODIES
| Beta-Hydroxybutyrate | ✓ | | | | | | |
| Acetoacetate | ✓ | | | | | | |
MUSCLE HEALTH
| 3-Methylhistidine | ✓ | | | | | | |
| Threonine | ✓ | | | | | | |
| Alloisoleucine | ✓ | | | | | | |
| Alpha-Aminoadipic acid | ✓ | | | | | | |
| Asparagine | ✓ | | | | | | |
| Valine | ✓ | | | | | | |
| Serine | ✓ | | | | | | |
| Sarcosine | ✓ | | | | | | |
| Proline | ✓ | | | | | | |
| Citrulline | ✓ | | | | | | |
| Glutamic acid | ✓ | | | | | | |
| Glutamine | ✓ | | | | | | |
| Histidine | ✓ | | | | | | |
| Isoleucine | ✓ | | | | | | |
| Ornithine | ✓ | | | | | | |
| Alpha-Aminobutyric acid | ✓ | | | | | | |
| Hydroxyproline | ✓ | | | | | | |
| Lysine | ✓ | | | | | | |
| Leucine | ✓ | | | | | | |
| Beta-Aminoisobutyric acid | ✓ | | | | | | |
| Phosphoethanolamine | ✓ | | | | | | |
| Glycine | ✓ | | | | | | |
CELL & TISSUE HEALTH
| Cytidine | ✓ | | | | | | |
| Cytidine monophosphate | ✓ | | | | | | |
| Cytidine triphosphate | ✓ | | | | | | |
| Cytosine | ✓ | | | | | | |
| Deoxycytidine monophosphate | ✓ | | | | | | |
| Deoxycytidine triphosphate | ✓ | | | | | | |
| Deoxyguanosine | ✓ | | | | | | |
| Deoxythymidine | ✓ | | | | | | |
| Deoxyuridine | ✓ | | | | | | |
| Deoxyuridine monophosphate | ✓ | | | | | | |
| Dihydroorotic acid | ✓ | | | | | | |
| Dihydrothymine | ✓ | | | | | | |
| Dihydrouracil | ✓ | | | | | | |
| Indole-3-acetic acid | ✓ | | | | | | |
| Inosine monophosphate | ✓ | | | | | | |
| Orotic acid | ✓ | | | | | | |
| S-adenosylhomocysteine | ✓ | | | | | | |
| Thymine | ✓ | | | | | | |
| Uracil | ✓ | | | | | | |
SUMMARY
| Total Biomarkers (Base Package) | 292 | 96 | 89 | 81 | 58 | 102 | 77 |
| Annual Price | $450 | $365 | $399 | $324 | Advanced Heart: $399 | $388 | Comprehensive: $495 |
| Blood Collection | At-home: 2 small vials | Quest: 10+ vials (2 visits) | Quest | Quest | Quest | Quest | LabCorp |
| Volume Blood Required | 1 ml | 50-130 mL | 50-130 mL | 50-130 mL | 50-130 mL | 50-130 mL | 50-130 mL |
| Follow-up | Abnormal markers retested | Generic fixed tests | | | Abnormal markers retested | | |
| Consultation | On-demand 1:1 | | | 45 min | 45 min | | 45 min: $100 |
| Turnaround Time | 3-7 days | Several weeks | 7 days | 7-14 days | 7-14 days | 7-14 days | 14 days |
| Proprietary Testing Technologies | Yes | No | No | No | No | No | No |
| Insurance Reimbursement | Yes | No | No | No | No | No | No |
| Medicare Approved | Yes | No | No | No | No | No | No |

- * These markers do not change management beyond what LDL-c and HDL-C already tell; rarely affects decision-making: guidelines don't base treatment on LDL size
- ** A positive ANA alone means very little; ANA is a context-dependent signal of immune activity, not a disease marker, and should only be ordered when there's clinical suspicion of autoimmune disease
- *** Unsuitable for capillary blood

== See also ==
- Clinical laboratory
- Blood test
- Laboratory developed test
- Point-of-care testing
- Personalized medicine
