= Ruth Sidransky =

American writer, advocate

- Born: July 1, 1929; Bronx, New York
- Died: October 7, 2017 (aged 88)
- Occupations: Writer, advocate for the deaf

Ruth Sidransky (July 1, 1929 – October 7, 2017) was an American advocate for the deaf. She was born in the Bronx, New York to deaf parents. Her first language was sign, which she used exclusively as a young child. She translated for her parents throughout their lives.

== Life and work ==
In 1990, Sidransky wrote In Silence, a memoir of her life among the world of the deaf. The New York Times called it "a great act of love." Sidransky appeared on Good Morning, America, and NPR and spoke on behalf of American Sign about its legitimacy as a distinct and singular language. Sidransky was the principal of an American school abroad, a private counselor to disabled children and a television show host in Canada.

Her son is functional medicine doctor Mark Hyman.

Sidransky co-founded the Jewish Community Association of the Deaf in Plantation with Hank Hyman. In her ninth decade, Sidransky published three books in 2015: A Woman’s Primer, a look at the qualities women need to survive and thrive; Bravo Carrie, her memoir of her adult daughter's struggle with cancer, and Reparations, a novel about young American Jews in Europe at the end of World War II.
