= Adil Akhtar =

Oncologist, physician, and artist

- Born: 1961 (age 64–65); Karachi, Pakistan
- Occupations: Physician (oncologist) painter - artist
- Spouse: Almas Akhtar

Adil Akhtar (born 1961) is an oncologist, hematologist physician and also a painter in Michigan, United States. His paintings and art work include religious themes.

== Early life and career ==
Akhtar was born in Karachi, Sindh, Pakistan in 1961. He had a modest start in life because his father, a government officer, died when he was two years old. In his immediate family, Akhtar has two sisters, as well as his mother as survivors. His uncle, who was a vice-chancellor at the University of Karachi Sindh, at the time, arranged for the family to live in a small home near the university campus. This childhood home address 'E-31' is hard to forget for Akhtar because he grew up in that home.

After completing his basic education plus two years of college, he qualified, and earned an admission in the Dow Medical College, Karachi. After graduation from this medical college, Adil Akhtar came to Baltimore, Maryland, USA for further studies in medicine. While studying medicine there, he started visiting the art museums in nearby Washington, D.C. Those visits to the museums inspired him and had aroused the hidden artist in him. Thus he decided to become a self-taught painter-artist.

In 2017, he works as a physician in Michigan. But Akhtar has a large area set aside as his painting studio, in his basement, at home. As painting tools, he uses brushes, pencils, charcoals, crayons and even his index finger. He sometimes even uses his palms and feet. It's quite an experience to watch him do his work.

Akhtar lives in Michigan with his wife, Almas, and three children. Talking about the above-mentioned small house that he grew up in, he said in an interview in 2015 to a major newspaper in Pakistan, 'His life in the house has had a major impact on him and that impact keeps revealing itself in his life as well as his art.'

== Paintings exhibits ==
Akhtar is an artist in the community and nationally as well. Exhibitions have been held for his work in both the United States and Pakistan:

- Canton, Ohio Exhibition: "Sacred Voices" (5 December 2013 – 2 March 2014 ) at the Canton Museum of Art
- Karachi Exhibition (March 2015 )- Karachi Commune Gallery
- Grand Rapids, Michigan- Gerald R. Ford Presidential Museum (September 2010)
- ArtExpo – New York (March 2011)
