= Grail, Inc. =

American health care company

GRAIL, Inc.
- Type: Public
- Traded as: Nasdaq: GRAL
- Industry: Biotechnology
- Founded: 2015; 11 years ago
- Headquarters: Menlo Park, California, United States
- Key people: Joshua Ofman (CEO); Harpal Kumar (president, Europe)
- Products: Galleri test
- Revenue: ▲US$126 million (2024)
- Operating income: ▼US$−2.2 billion (2024)
- Net income: ▼US$−2.0 billion (2024)
- Total assets: ▼US$2.98 billion (2024)
- Total equity: ▼US$2.50 billion (2024)
- Number of employees: 1,000 (2024)
- Website: grail.com

GRAIL, Inc. is an American biotechnology company based in Menlo Park, California founded in 2015 seeking to develop an early cancer screening test for people who do not have symptoms. As a startup it was a subsidiary of Illumina, which bought it outright in 2021.

In June 2021, GRAIL launched their liquid biopsy, or multi-cancer early detection test, which they called Galleri test. In 2023, EU regulators ordered Grail to be spun-out from Illumina which was completed on June 24, 2024.

Joshua Ofman is CEO.

== Activities ==
Illumina's own research showed that repeatedly sequencing DNA in the bloodstream made it possible to detect floating bits of DNA from cancer cells more accurately. It initially aimed to recruit greater than 100,000 people into its clinical trials in order to accumulate the sizeable data required to detect and interpret cancer biomarkers.

=== Galleri test ===
As of November 2020, Galleri investigated three multi-cancer screening tests.

In June 2021 Galleri launched their liquid biopsy or multi-cancer early detection test (MCED), which Grail called the Galleri test. Grail promoted the test as a "groundbreaking and potentially life-saving advance", although the results of early trials were poor. A subsequent large-scale NHS England trial was described as overhyped and unethical. As of 2024, Grail was facing discontent and legal action from investors.

On 17 October 2025, BBC news carried positive coverage of test results just presented at the European Society for Medical Oncology. However, as of October 20, 2025 the results of the PATHFINDER 2 study have yet to be peer reviewed or published. Eric Topol reported a sensitivity of only 40% these false negatives failed to discover cancer that emerged during the 12-month follow-up.

== Company history ==
Grail began as a San Francisco biotechnology and pharmaceutical startup company in 2015, the parent company being Illumina of San Diego, which produces most of the DNA sequencing machines that scientists use to study human biology and diagnose rare genetic diseases. Richard Klausner, then chief medical officer at Illumina and former director of the National Cancer Institute, advocated for the new business. According to the San Francisco Business Times, he correctly predicted how DNA sequencing technology would make it possible to detect evidence of a tumor from a blood sample. He also joined Grail's board of directors. According to Forbes in 2017, 20% of Grail's profits are kept by Illumina.

In September 2020, Illumina announced an agreement to purchase Grail outright for $7.1 billion.

On November 27, 2020, Grail announced a commercial partnership with the National Health Service (England) (NHS), to trial the Galleri test, reporting in 2026.

In March 2021, the Federal Trade Commission (FTC) sued to block the vertical merger. In September 2022, an administrative judge ruled against the FTC's position on antitrust grounds.

In June 2023, Grail disclosed that letters were mailed to 408 patients incorrectly informing them that they may have cancer. The company blamed the incident on PWNHealth, saying that it was due to a software configuration issue, not due to incorrect Galleri test results.

In October 2023, the European Commission ordered Grail to be divested from Illumina within the next twelve months. The European Commission (EC) has since approved Illumina's divestment plan for separating from Grail. Illumina has set a goal of finalizing the divestment terms by the end of the second quarter of 2024. In April 2024, the EC approved Illumina's plan, allowing Illumina to explore either a trade sale or a capital markets transaction (spin-off) to divest Grail. In May 2024, Illumina publicly filed a Form 10 registration statement with the U.S. SEC, a necessary step for a potential capital markets separation of Grail. If a capital markets transaction occurs, Illumina must capitalize Grail with around $1 billion to fund 2.5 years of operations per the EC's divestment plan. The spinoff was completed in June 2024, with Grail trading on the Nasdaq with ticker symbol GRAL and Illumina retaining a 14.5% share of Grail.

In March 2026, former CEO Bob Ragusa announced his retirement. In June 2026, former president of Grail, Dr. Joshua Ofman, was appointed as CEO of the company.
