= Cromwell House =

Grade I Listed house

Coordinates: 51.5698°N 0.143013°W

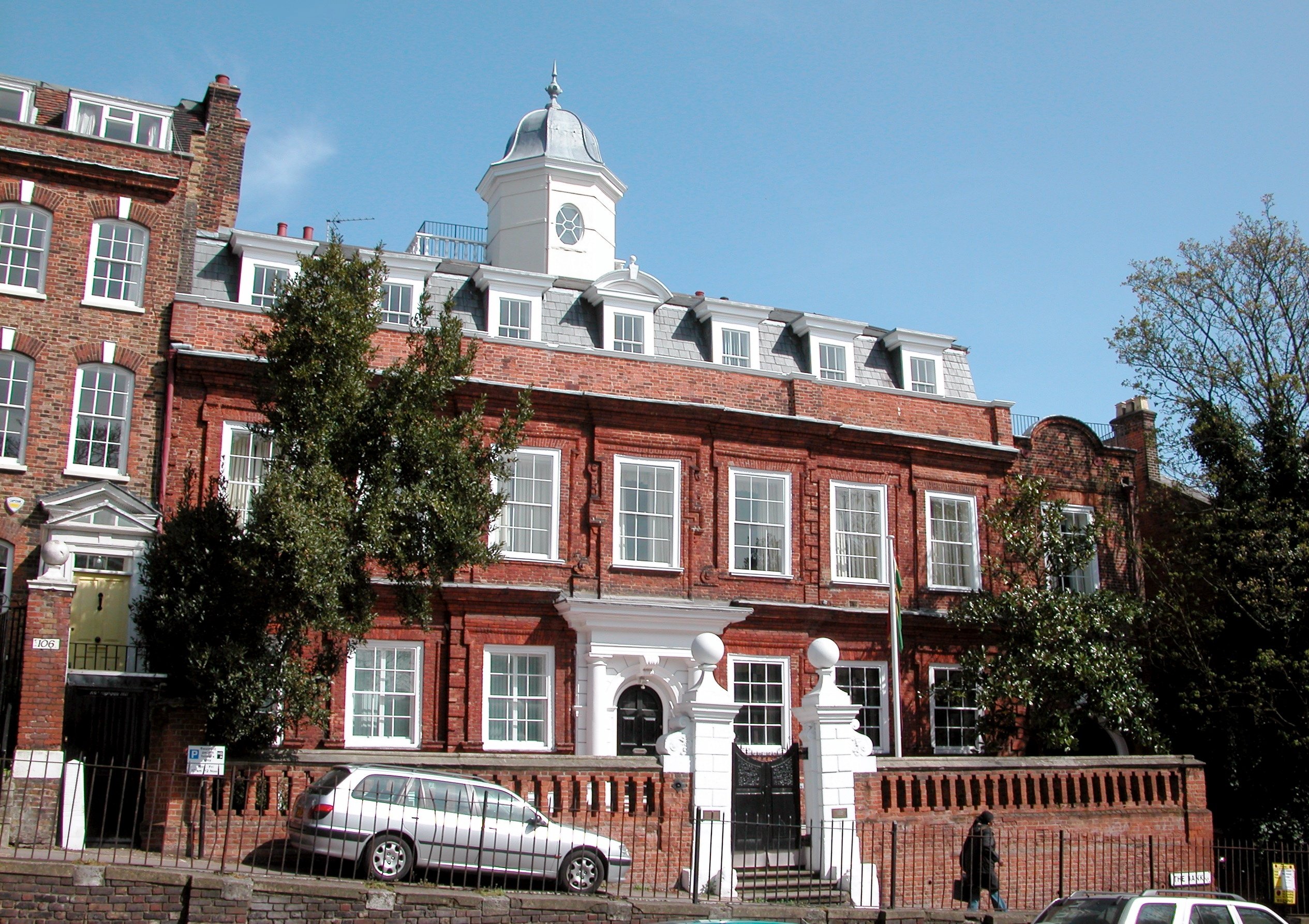
- Frontage to Highgate Hill
- Interactive map of the Cromwell House area
- Alternative names: High Commission of the Republic of Ghana

General information
- Status: Grade I listed building
- Type: Diplomatic Mission
- Architectural style: Stuart
- Location: 104 Highgate Hill, London, N6 5HE, London Borough of Haringey, United Kingdom
- Elevation: 360 ft (110 m)
- Completed: 1638
- Client: Richard Sprignell
- Owner: Republic of Ghana

Design and construction
- Architect: Unknown

Cromwell House is a Grade I listed building built in 1638 in Highgate Village, now a suburb of London. It is currently owned by the Republic of Ghana and used as an annex of its high commission.

== The builder of the house ==
Cromwell House was commissioned by Sir Richard Sprignell, who was born about 1603, the eldest son of Robert Sprignell, Esquire (1560–1624) and Susan Daniell, and was educated at Brasenose College, Oxford, where he matriculated in January 1620 aged seventeen and graduated BA in February 1622. On the death of his parents in 1627, Sprignell inherited some houses in Whitefriars Street, two manors in Essex, Great and Little Maldon, and one in Yorkshire, Copmanthorpe, and some property in Middlesex, described as "dwelling house, yards, backsides, gardens, Palefield and four other fields adjoining ... in the parish of Harringay alias Hornsey". In 1634, Sprignell was commissioned as a Captain of Train-Bands and in 1639 became a governor of Highgate grammar school. In 1641, Charles I created him a Baronet.

Sprignell married Anne Delaune, whose father, Gideon Delaune, was the apothecary to Queen Anne, wife of James I. Sometimes called the founder the Worshipful Society of Apothecaries, Delaune r its most important member. Although he was a foreign national, at the urging of Charles I he was granted the freedom of the City of London. In 1628 he became Master of the Apothecaries in a contested election and was elected again in 1636. He married secondly Judith Chamberlaine of London, whose father was Henry Chamberlaine, and together they had at least seventeen children.

== Architecture and history ==
The identity of the original architect of Cromwell House remains unknown, but it is certainly a tour-de-force on the part of a highly skilled brick-layer/contractor. Built in 1637–38, it infers the influence of Inigo Jones in the regularity of its seven-window frontage. It is recognised as one of the finest examples, along with Kew Palace, of the 17th-century "artisan mannerist" style of domestic architecture in London to have survived virtually intact. Behind the elaborately carved red-brick facade, it has an oak staircase of national importance, the design of which may have been influenced by that at Blickling Hall, built twenty years earlier, the country house of Sir Henry Hobart, whose other home was Lauderdale House, which directly faces Cromwell House on the other side of Highgate Hill. Sir Richard commissioned wooden carvings of military figures of the Stuart period to stand on each newel post of the staircase; and in 1639, when he obtained his grant of arms, he had them incorporated into the centre of the elaborate plaster ceiling of the principal room. In 1678–79, the da Costa family built a new wing to the north of the house and added the carriageway entrance to the south, with two rooms above it, one of which has the da Costa crest on a fine fireplace surround. During its period as a school in the mid-19th century, a gabled rear extension was added for use as a dining hall, and in 1865 a serious fire destroyed the roof, the old dome, and the second floor. In the 20th century, a large rear wing was constructed on the north-east side, which is now used as offices. In 1951 the building was listed Grade I, a category reserved for buildings of exceptional interest.

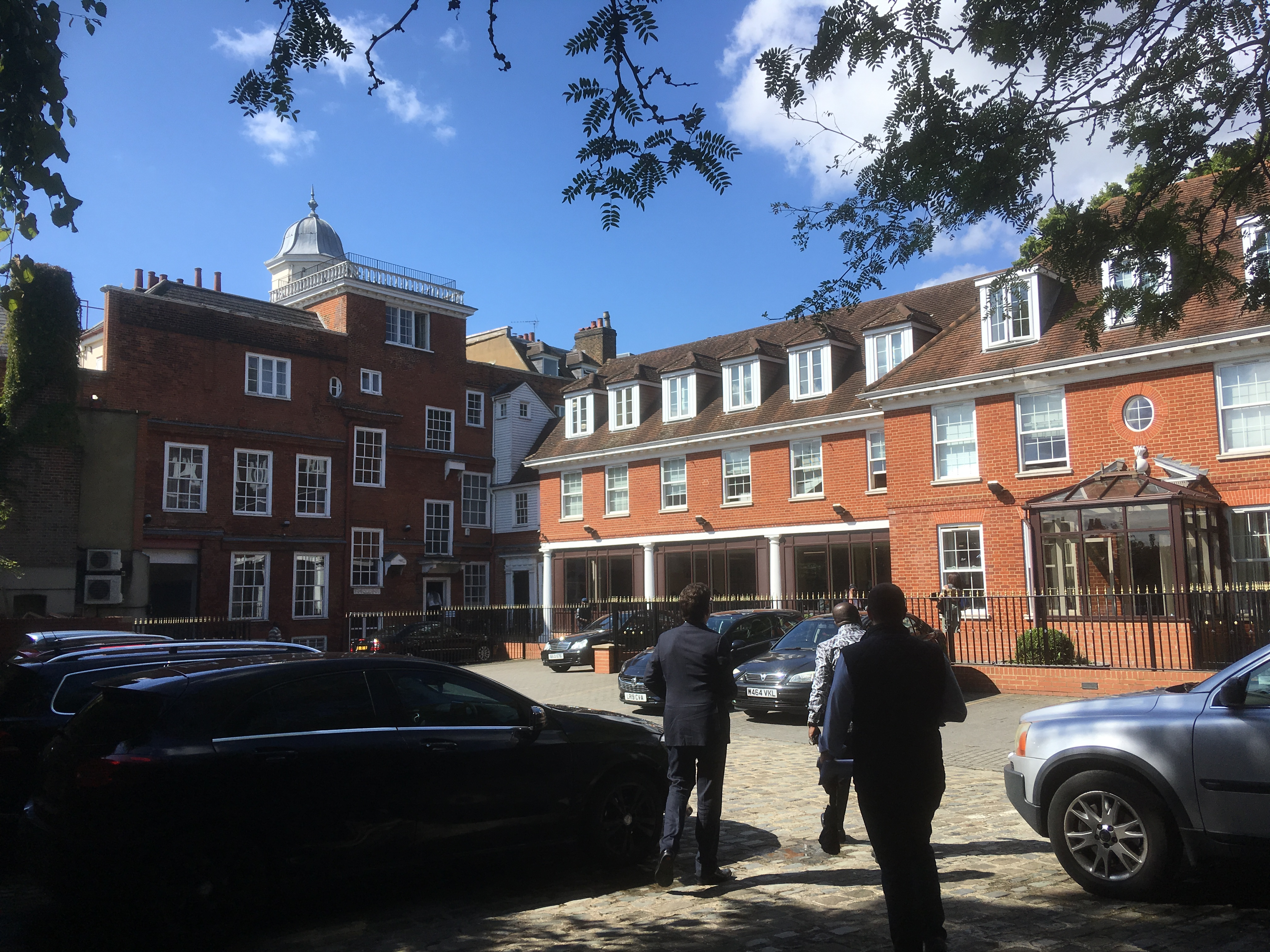
Rear view of Cromwell House

While the house stood empty in the 1980s, architectural antiques were stolen from it, including carved wooden figures lining the staircase and a marble chimneypiece in an upstairs room. Many of the missing carved figures were later replaced by plaster copies.

The listing particulars call the house a "splendid example of Renaissance brickwork". They note the mansard roof in slate has seven dormer windows, the fourth with a pediment, in the centre a flat roof with a balustrade and a lead cupola standing on a tall octagonal column. As well as its two main storeys, the building has a basement and an attic. A three-bay brick centre stands a little forward of the main front, and the brickwork has stone quoins at the angles. At first floor level are entablatures, with a parapet above, and brick-eared window architraves. The sash windows and their glazing bars date from the early 19th century. The front door with six panels is round-headed, the top panel glazed to let in light, and is set in a moulded architrave. The Tuscan doorcase dates from the 18th century.

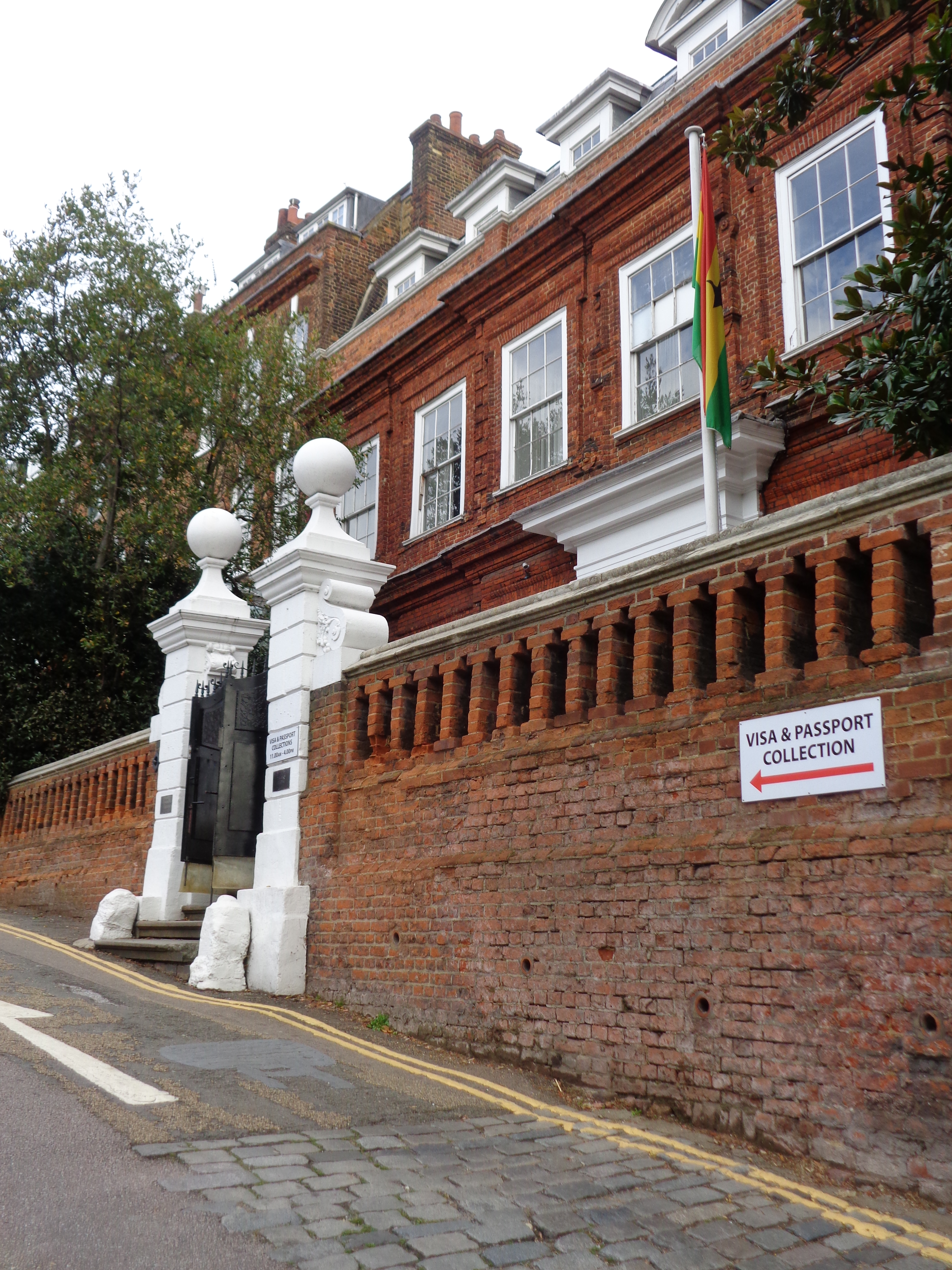
The forecourt walls

Inside the house, the important staircase rises from the ground floor to the second floor, and many doors and doorcases, carved stone chimneypieces, and plaster ceilings also date from the 17th century, with 18th-century features added. One large room is completely panelled, from floor to ceiling.

The brick forecourt walls of the house, topped with brick balustrading, also date from the 17th century and are listed separately, also at Grade I. Their stone coping, and the stone gate piers with cornices and finials flanking the entrance, are from a later period. The walls and gates of Cromwell House form an architectural group with others in front of the houses on each side.

== Name of the house ==
In connection with 104, Highgate Hill, the earliest mention of the name Cromwell which has been found is in the Holden London Directory of 1809, which lists George Ranking as living at Cromwell House, so it is probable that Ranking gave the name to the house after he bought it in 1797. Earlier, during the ownership of the da Costa family, there is some evidence that it may have been called Highgate House.

Cromwell House dates from the lifetime of Oliver Cromwell, and its name has led to a widespread belief that he or his son-in-law General Henry Ireton at some point owned or lived in it, or in an earlier building. However, the owners throughout the seventeenth century are well documented, and neither the Protector nor his son-in-law are among them. Nothing even demonstrates that either was ever at Highgate. John Ireton, a brother of the General, was a leading resident of Highgate and was a friend of the Sprignells, and one of them married a daughter of one of those who signed the death warrant of Charles II. The name of Cromwell has also been applied to other houses near London, none of which is connected with him.

== Owners and occupiers ==
Sir Robert Sprignell (1622–1690) the eldest son of Sir Richard Sprignell, was the second owner of the house. On the Parliamentary side during the Civil Wars, he is said to have "deliberately run away" from the fighting at Cheriton Down. At the Restoration in 1660, he ran away again to the Low Countries, and in 1664 sold the house to George Hill, a member of Clifford's Inn, with its garden, and sold nineteen acres (7.7 hectares) of land adjacent to it to Robert Young, a scrivener in the City of London. Five years later, the house and garden were sold to Sir Thomas Hooke of Lincoln's Inn, who in turn sold it to Alvares da Costa in 1675.

Escaping the inquisition, Alvares (or Alvaro), a wealthy merchant of Portuguese Jewish origins, had arrived in England in 1661 as part of the entourage of Charles II's wife, Catherine of Braganza. Other members of his family joined him in the country, including Fernando Mendes, his cousin and brother-in-law, who became the Queen's physician. Because of the anti-Catholic fervour of the late 1670s, the family came out openly as Jewish, and thus Cromwell House became the first Jewish-owned property in England since the 1290 Jewish expulsion. The building became the suburban hub of the large da Costa clan, and during their 74-year ownership the house was expanded to meet their needs. Other distinguished family members included the banker Moses da Costa and the miniaturist Catherine da Costa. In 1705, Alvares da Costa bought back the nineteen acres of adjoining land sold by Sir Robert Sprignell, eighteen acres (7.3 hectares) of which was subsequently sold in 1742 by his son who had inherited the estate, but had been in financial difficulties ever since losing heavily in the South Sea Bubble of 1720. He kept only the acre to the east adjoining the garden of the house.

In 1749, the House was bought by Sir John Thompson, alderman of the City of London, who died in 1750. On the death of his widow, Dame Catharine Thompson, in 1766, it was sold to Thomas Saunders, who sold it to Samuel Provey, after whose death it was sold in 1797 to George Ranking, a merchant in Cheapside. The next owner, from 1811, was William Higgins of Mill Hill who ten years later sold to Richard Cumberlege Ware, who after just two years sold it to Thomas Hurst, a print seller and publisher. He subsequently became bankrupt, and so in 1833 the house passed to Richard Nixon of 4 The Grove, who brought its use as a private house to an end.

From 1834, Cromwell House was used as a boys' school, run first by William Addison, then from 1843 by Gerrit Van der Linde (1808–1858), a Dutch poet and scholar, who ran a college français, and after his death in 1858 by the Rev. Stretton until the School's closure in 1867. Thomas Bedggood, the owner from 1841, passed the property in trust to his four daughters, who in 1868 granted a 70-year lease to the Great Ormond Street Hospital for Sick Children to use as a Convalescent Hospital, with an annual intake of some four hundred young patients. The Hospital moved out of the building in 1924, and the remainder of the lease was bought by the Mothercraft Training Society, founded by Dr Truby King, who espoused a strict method of infant care and nutrition. In the late 1930s the freehold was acquired from the grandchildren of Thomas Bedggood (the Russell family). Between 1928 and 1930 the Society built a residential annex, called The Princess Elizabeth of York Hostel, on the remaining acre of land originally acquired by Alvares da Costa in 1705, and in 1939 the buildings became the Truby King Home for Children.

In 1951 the Mothercraft Training Society closed and The Princess Elizabeth of York Hostel (now listed Grade II) was sold separately to the Metropolitan Police Service as accommodation for police officers, and is now student accommodation, accessed from Winchester Place, called Princess Elizabeth House. Cromwell House was sold to the Church of England Zenana Missionary Society (absorbed into the Church Missionary Society in 1957), to be followed in 1970 by the Roman Catholic Montfort Fathers who vacated in 1983. The building stood empty for several years, which worried local residents to such an extent that an Independent Cromwell House Working Group was formed to campaign for the preservation of the house. In 1988, it was sold to a developer who undertook renovations and it was subsequently sold to its current owner, the Republic of Ghana, which uses it as the Visa Section of its High Commission in Belgravia.

== Gallery ==
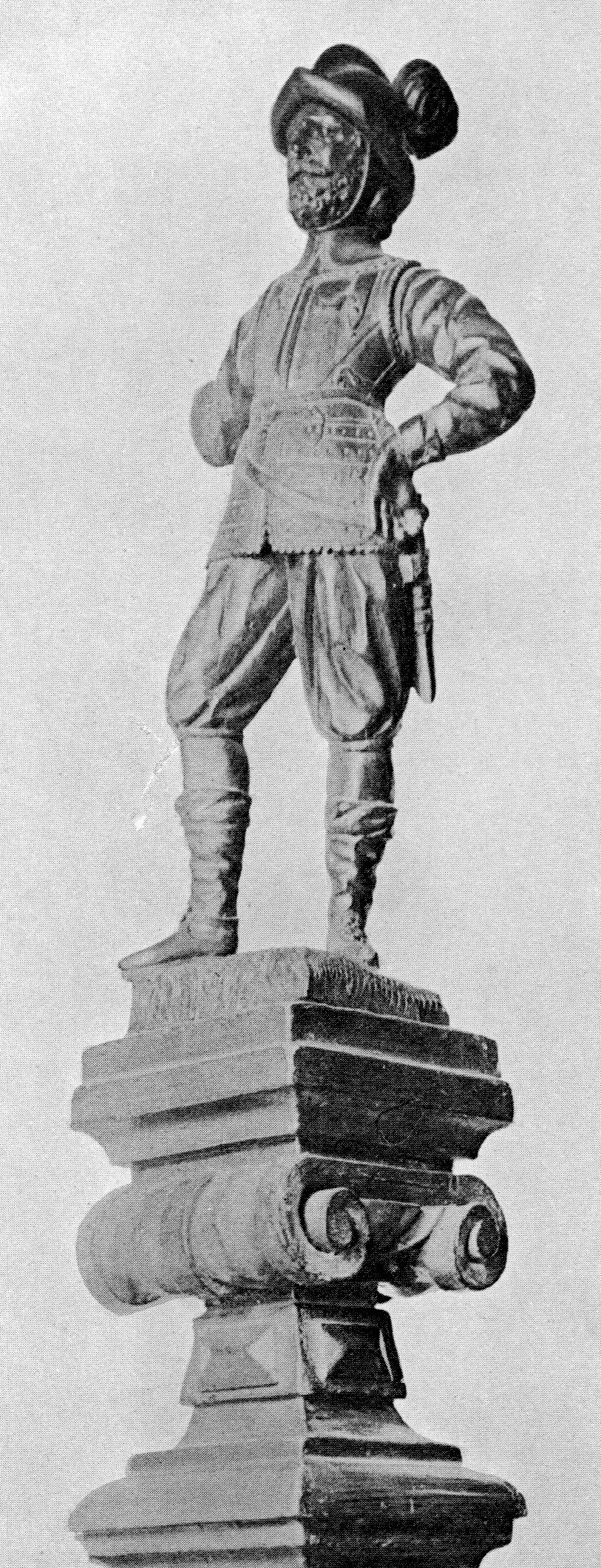
Photo of carved figure from staircase of Cromwell House from the Survey of London

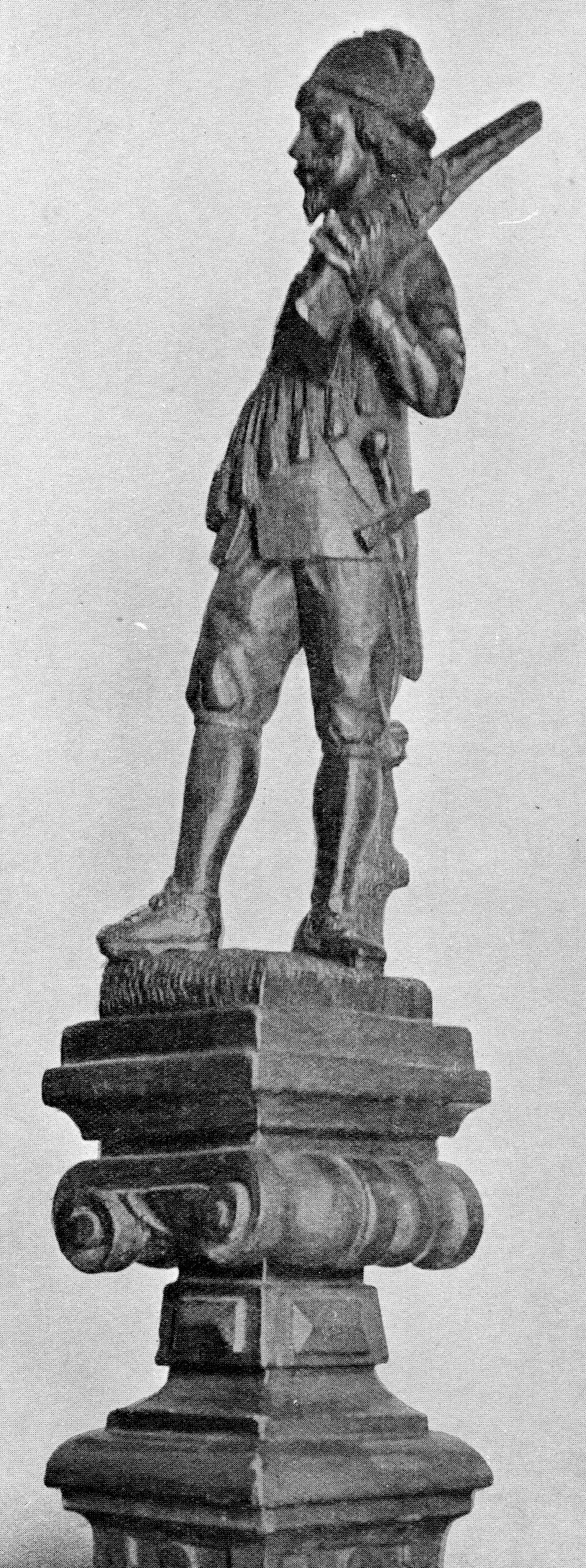
Photo of a carved figure carrying a musket on staircase in Cromwell House from the Survey of London

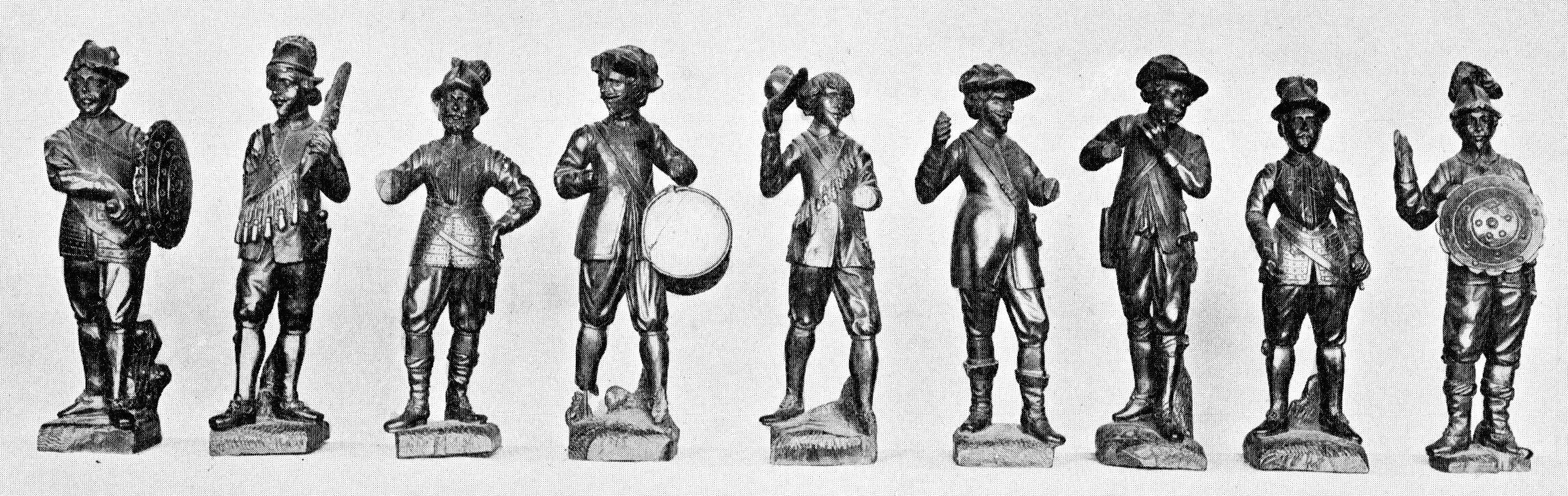
Carved figures from the staircase of Cromwell House, from the Survey of London

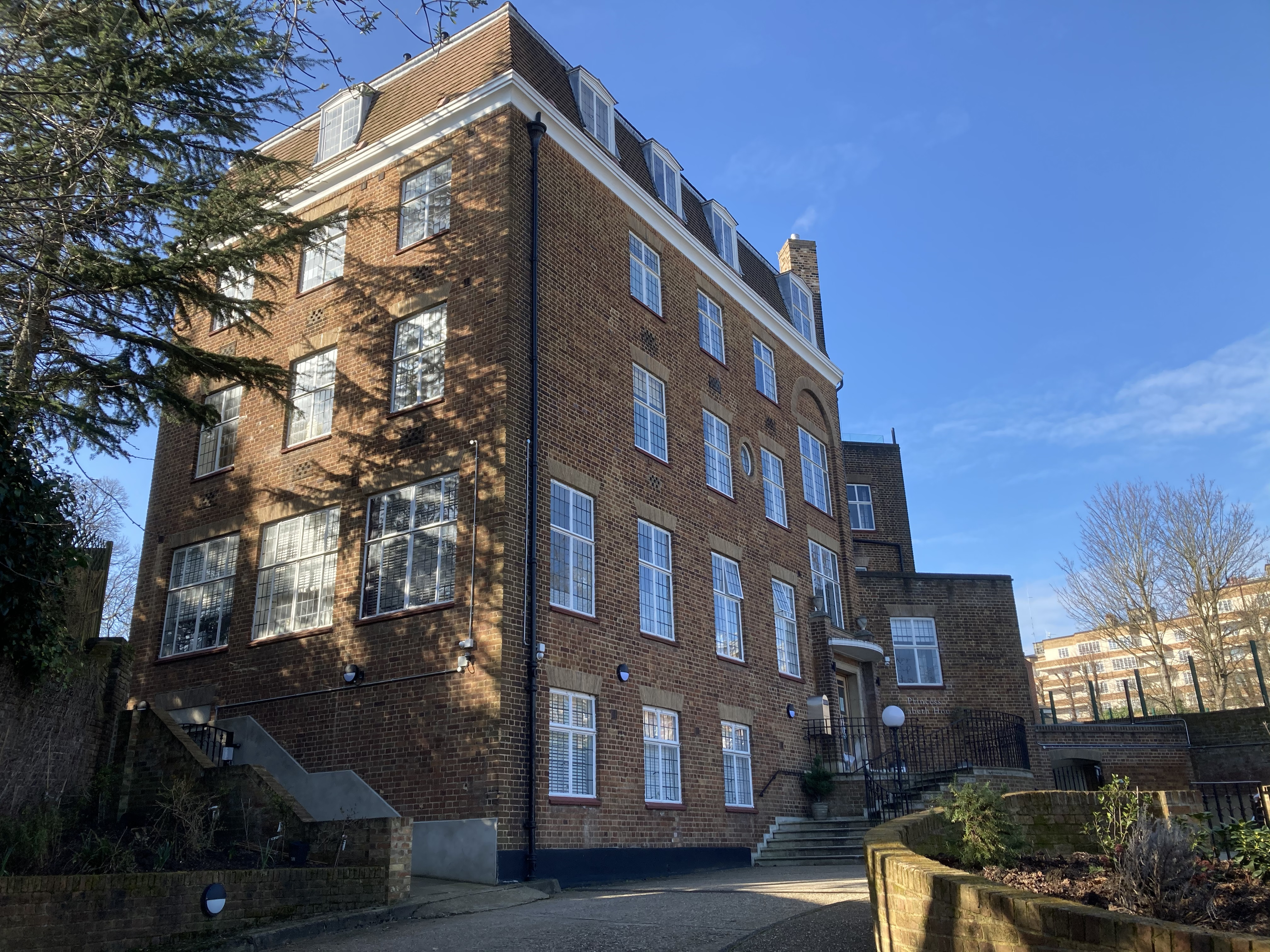
The Princess Elizabeth of York Hostel, built 1928–30, in the grounds of Cromwell House

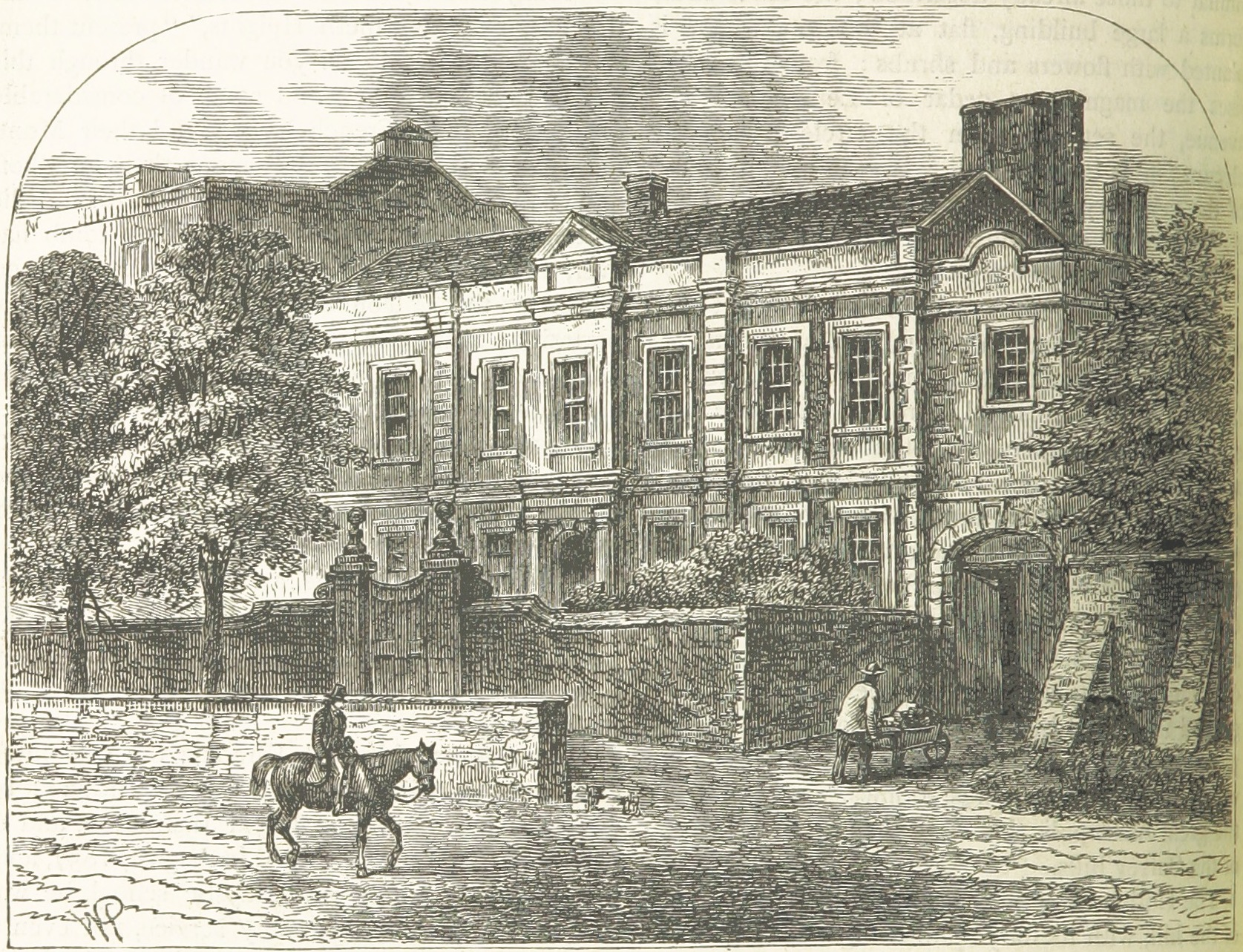
Cromwell House

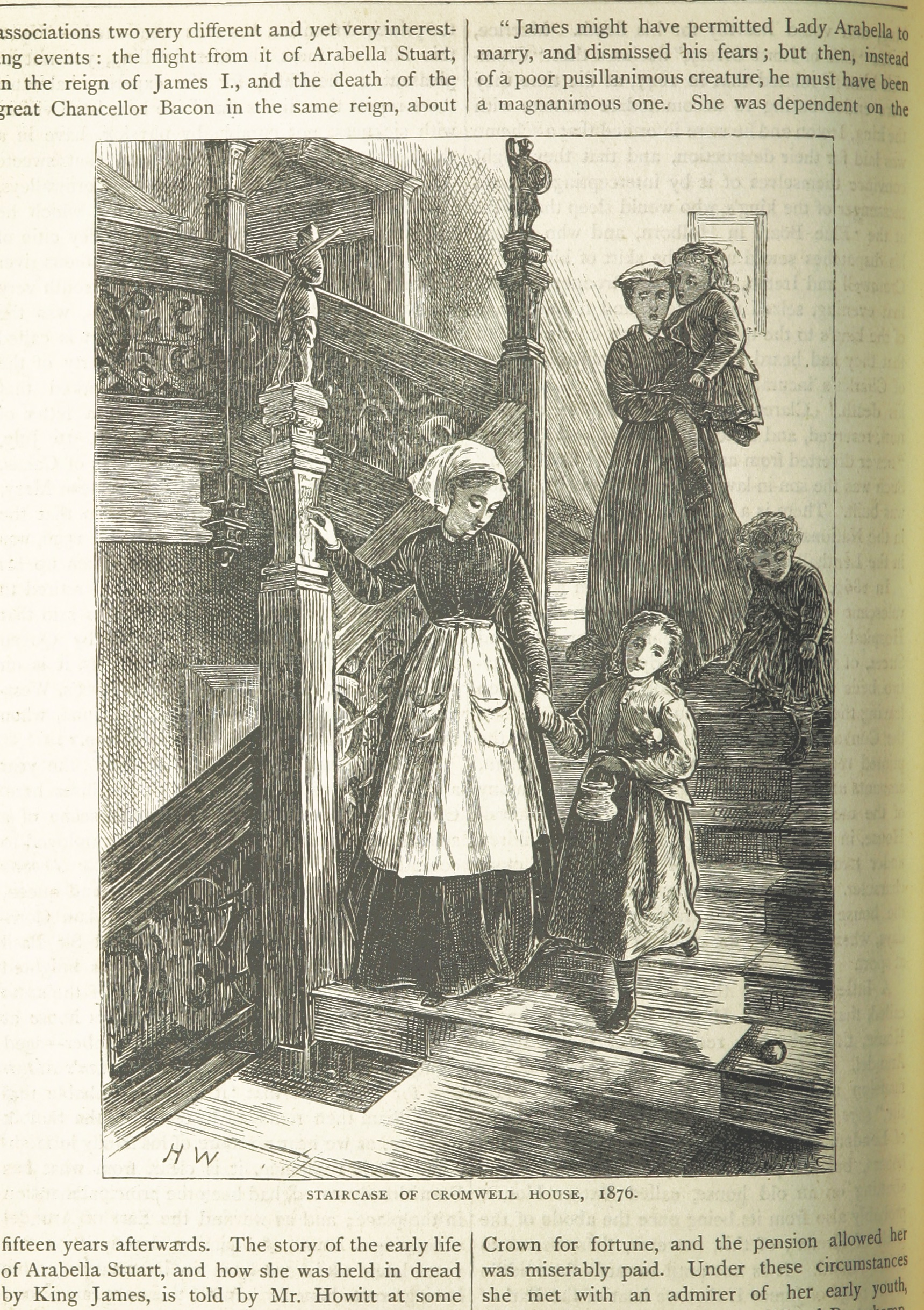
Staircase in Cromwell House 1870

== Bibliography ==
- Richardson, John (1983), Highgate: Its History since the Fifteenth Century, Eyre and Spottiswoode, ISBN 0-9503656-4-5
- Norman, Philip (1926), Cromwell House: Historical notes, P.15-35. Survey of London Monograph 12, Cromwell House, Highgate, London County Council
