= DeLaune =

DeLaune is a family name. Notable people with the name include:

- Étienne Delaune, French goldsmith, medallist, draughtsman and engraver
- Gary DeLaune (1933–2022), American news reporter
- Gideon Delaune (1565?–1659), French apothecary
- Michelle DeLaune, American nonprofit executive and criminologist
- Paul Delaune, English physician
- William Delaune (died 1610), French physician and minister
- William Delaune (1659–1728), English clergyman and academic
