= Thorndike Shaw =

The Ven (Herbert) Thorndike Shaw
- Anglican Archdeacon of Grenada
- Church: Church of England
- See: Windward Isles
- In office: 1937–1945
- Previous post: Vicar of Copmanthorpe

(Herbert) Thorndike Shaw was an Anglican priest in the mid twentieth century.

He was educated at Keble College, Oxford; and ordained in 1927. After a curacies in Byker, Whitley Bay and Newcastle he was Vicar of Copmanthorpe from 1932 until 1937. He was Archdeacon of Grenada from 1937 to 1945 when he returned to England to be Rector of Wokingham.
