= Newnham, Kent =

Village in Kent, England

Coordinates: 51.26667°N 0.8000°E

Newnham
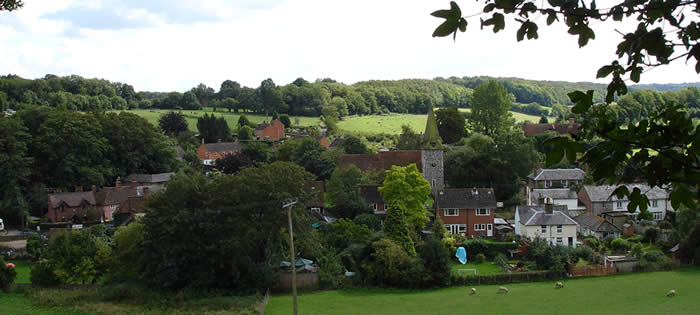
- View of Newnham from Hilly Field

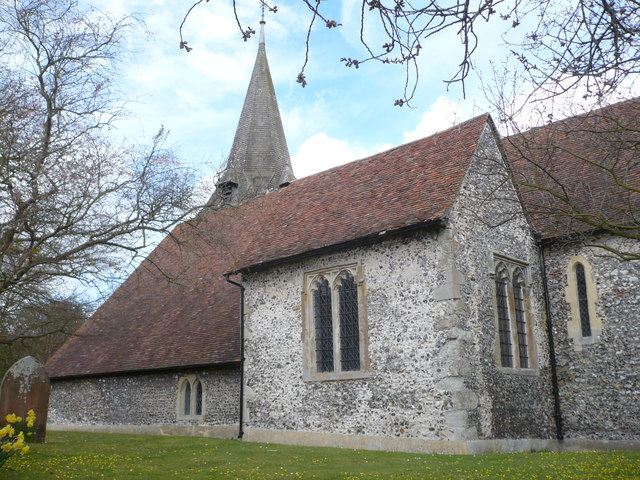
- The church, beside a lychgate, churchyard, The Street and bus stop

- Location within Kent
- Population: 386 (2011 Census)
- District: Swale
- Shire county: Kent
- Region: South East
- Country: England
- Sovereign state: United Kingdom
- Post town: Sittingbourne
- Postcode district: ME9
- Dialling code: 01795
- Police: Kent
- Fire: Kent
- Ambulance: South East Coast
- UK Parliament: Faversham and Mid Kent

Newnham is a village and civil parish in the Syndale valley in Kent, England, in the administrative borough of Swale near the medieval market town of Faversham.

== History ==
Newnham has existed as a community of dwellings and work-units for at least 1,000 years. Though it had a lord of the manor and the church of SS Peter and Paul at the beginning of the 12th century, it could be said that nothing of importance ever happened there; yet in it took place centuries of everyday social history and a history of domestic and economic life of generations of English people.

Originally little more than a grouping of farmhouses and farmworkers' cottages clustered around a church and pub, both more than 600 years old, the village featured blacksmiths, a draper, a butcher, a baker and several other shops and pubs by the early 20th century.

Even until the Second World War, most of its inhabitants were born, worked, lived and died in the valley. Many of the men worked on the hop farms, the apple and cherry orchards, or the wood industries that dominated the local economy. The women were domestic servants in some of the larger houses, many set in parklands on surrounding hills (Sharsted Court, Doddington House, Belmont, Champion Court).

== A modern village life ==
Newnham has changed over the past 250 years, and retains the feel of a southern English village, though few farmworkers still live there. Railway connections to London and the continent of Europe with jobs in Ashford, Canterbury, Maidstone and Medway became available after the completion of the M20, M2, M26 and M25 between the mid-1960s and early 1990s.

The police house was sold as a private residence in the 1990s, and the post office shut in 1998 while the last shop closed in 2002. A single pub-restaurant remains: opposite the church is the George Inn, which is now no longer mainly a drinking house for locals but instead attracts families and groups of businesspeople for meals. It features 16th-century rafters, inglenook fireplaces, and beer brewed locally (Shepherd Neame at Faversham), and a garden that looks up to the Hilly Field.

Above the field stands the 12th-century manor house, Champion Court, still an apple farm, though employing few people now and an abundance of modern science, overlooking the valley. The other pub-restaurant is much newer but has the air of a barn converted from use on the Syndale vineyard. From its garden there is another striking view across the village past the oast house, now converted from drying hops for beer into a private home. At the location of Syndale Vineyard is also the local brewery, Hopdaemon.

The church's glebe lands, near the centre of the village, provided the space for a post-war housing development. Most of the other houses in the village front onto The Street and include Tudor dwellings, Victorian terraced cottages, and many houses now joined to make larger homes. There is also a collection of infilled recently built houses squeezed into former orchards and fields that abutted The Street and which provided the only late 20th-century development land (which has to be within the "village envelope" according to planning restrictions).

== Architecture and Economy ==
Much of the village is a conservation area and several buildings are individually listed while the village is within the Kent Downs Area of Outstanding Natural Beauty (Kent Downs AONB). Building in the open countryside is tightly restricted, in favour of agriculture, horse-riding and walking. The average commuting distance is 22.56 kilometres (14.02 mi).

A notable listed house is Calico House, built in the early 17th century. Another sizeable house was the 19th-century vicarage, no longer used as such. It was built in 1860 by the incumbent vicar who also rebuilt the crumbling church, largely at his own expense. The tiny Congregationalist chapel, a widespread church of nonconformism also stands, currently being converted to a small private house.

The valley road was a highway in Norman times, linking the Roman Watling Street (Dover and Canterbury to London, the A2) to the Pilgrims' Way on the other side of the downs. However it was almost impassable in winter and Newnham was substantially self-sufficient until the 19th century. Indeed, the shops that residents whose closure the older villagers bemoan probably did not begin till the 1840 when passing tradesmen and deliveries made it possible to open a draper's and grocery shop. A 2010 excavation established that a full-scale Roman road passed along the valley though its precise route remains to be confirmed; it has been explored only near the Watling Street (A2) Syndale junction and at the foot of Newnham's "hilly field".

Many farmhouses in the village, including the old Parsonage Farm whose farmhouse now stands in only half an acre next to the church in The Street, have yielded most of their farmlands to provide space to accommodate new homes.

== Church, school and amenities ==
The church of SS Peter and Paul dates back to medieval times and now shares a vicar with half a dozen other parishes. The village no longer has a school of its own (indeed it lost it as early as 1877 when the board school opened in Doddington, the only other village in the valley. Doddington lost its primary school too in 2008).

Nearby Doddington still has a butcher's shop and that successor of the village blacksmith, a garage and petrol station, as well as its pub and church. It also has a hostel for walkers to complement the bed and breakfast accommodation it offers to visitors to the area.

Both villages, about 2 miles (3.2 km) apart, have a village hall, now used for keep-fit classes and the occasional auction or flower show. They share a war memorial to those killed in two world wars. Neither village in the valley has street lights or mains drainage as there is little demand for such.

The valley is chalky downland and is atop a plentiful aquifer which provides water to the nearby urban communities. The pumping station in the valley stands beside a unique 1937 experimental building, recently bought and undergoing conversion to residential use. The building was designed to soften the hard lime-scaling water which it pumps from the ground. The Twentieth Century Society proposed the concrete structures for listing citing their "tremendous sculptural qualities" and Grade II listing was granted in November 2006. As such, it joined a range of older and more traditional buildings, including several thatched houses.

The population of Newnham numbered 24 householders in 1569. In the first national census in 1801, there were 262 residents reaching what may have been a peak of 451 in 88 houses in 1841 just before out-migration began in earnest. In 1931, there were 258 people in 92 homes and there are now about 350 people in 145 houses.
