= Sprignell baronets =

Extinct baronetcy in the Baronetage of England

The Sprignell Baronetcy, of Coppenthorp, now called Copmanthorpe, in the historic county of Yorkshire, was a title in the Baronetage of England. It was created on 14 August 1641 for Richard Sprignell. The title became extinct on the death of the third Baronet in 1691.

Escutcheon of the Sprignell baronets of Coppenthorp

== Sprignell baronets, of Coppenthorp (1641) ==
=== Sir Richard Sprignell, 1st Baronet (1599–1659) ===
Sir Richard Sprignell was born around 1603 to Robert and Susan Sprignell of Hornsey in the County of Middlesex. He attended Brasenose College, Oxford, between 1620 and 1622. On his mother's death in 1627 he inherited some houses in Whitefriars Street, the Manors of Great and Little Maldon in Essex and Copmanthorpe in Yorkshire in addition to his parents' dwelling house, garden and fields in the parish of Hornsey in the county of Middlesex. On this site in Highgate Village he commissioned an extremely fine new house, later called Cromwell House, built 1637–8, which is now a Grade I listed building. He became a Captain of Train-Bands in 1634 and a governor of the Highgate grammar school in 1639. Sprignell was created a Baronet in 1641.

He married Anne, daughter of Judith Chamberlaine and Gideon Delaune, apothecary to Anne of Denmark, James I's consort, by far the most prominent member of the Guild of Apothecaries and sometimes called its founder. Although a foreign national, he obtained the freedom of the City at the King's request, and was elected Master of the Apothecaries after a contest in 1628, and again in 1636.

Sir Richard and Anne had two sons that survived, Robert and William. Sir Richard died in 1659.

=== Sir Robert Sprignell, 2nd Baronet (1622–1688) ===
Sir Robert, born in 1622, was the eldest child of Sir Richard Sprignell and his wife Anne. He succeeded to the title on the death of his father. He married Anne, daughter of Sir Michael Livesey, who fought for Parliament during the Wars of the Three Kingdoms and was one of the regicides who approved the Execution of Charles I in January 1649. Robert lived quietly at Copmanthorpe in North Yorkshire; when his mother died, he sold Cromwell House and its garden to George Hill of Clifford's Inn in 1664, and 19 acres of attached land to Robert Young. He died sometime before November 1688 without issue. He was buried at St George the Martyr, Southwark on 18 May 1688.

=== Sir William Sprignell, 3rd Baronet (1624–1691) ===
Sir William, born in 1624, was the youngest son of Sir Richard Sprignell and his wife Anne. He succeeded to the title upon his brother's death, there being no issue from his marriage. Sir William never married and the Baronetcy died with him in 1691.

== See also ==
- List of baronetcies in the Baronetage of England

== Sources ==
- Burke, John; Burke, Bernard (1844). A Genealogical and Heraldic History of the Extinct and Dormant Baronetcies of England, Ireland and Scotland. John Russ Smith.
- Norman, Philip (1926). Survey of London Monograph 12, Cromwell House, Highgate. Guild & School of Handicraft, London.
