= Listed buildings in Copmanthorpe =

Copmanthorpe is a civil parish in the unitary authority of the City of York, North Yorkshire, England. It contains seven listed buildings that are recorded in the National Heritage List for England. All the listed buildings are designated at Grade II, the lowest of the three grades, which is applied to "buildings of national importance and special interest". The parish contains the village of Copmanthorpe and the surrounding area. The listed buildings consist of a church, houses and two milestones.

== Buildings ==
Name and location	Photograph	Date	Notes
St Giles' Church; 53.91499°N 1.14106°W		12th century	The church has been altered and extended through the centuries, including the addition of a chancel in Norman style by C. Hodgson Fowler in 1889. It is built in magnesian limestone, partly rendered and colourwashed, with a brick outshut and a Welsh slate roof. The church consists of a nave and a chancel in one, a west porch and a north outshut. The doorway dates from the 12th century, and has a chamfered surround, and single nook shaft with scalloped capitals supporting an arch with ball moulding. On the west gable is a bell turret with twin round-arched bell openings. Most of the windows have round-arched heads.
6 Main Street; 53.91477°N 1.14183°W	—	c. 1700	The house is in rendered and colourwashed brick, with brick outshuts, full-height pilasters, a moulded floor band, a brick eaves band, a wooden modillion eaves band, and a hipped pantile roof. There are two storeys and three bays. In the centre is a doorway with a moulded surround and an oblong fanlight. The windows are sashes in architraves.
Oak Lea; 53.91399°N 1.14217°W	—	1703	The house is in rendered brick, with a stepped floor band, and a pantile roof with rendered brick coping to the gable ends. There are two storeys, two bays and a rear outshut. On the left is a gabled porch, and the windows are casements. On the front is an inscribed and dated plaque.
4 Main Street; 53.91490°N 1.14178°W	—	18th century	The house is in pinkish-brown brick, with red brick dressings, quoins, and a Welsh slate roof. There are two storeys and three bays. In the centre is a doorcase of Roman Doric columns with a frieze and a cornice, and a doorway with a radial fanlight. The windows are sashes in architraves under cambered heads.
Ashfield Grange; 53.91187°N 1.14234°W	—	Early 19th century	The house is in pinkish-brown brick with a Welsh slate roof. There are two storeys and three bays. The doorway has pilasters, a frieze and a modillion hood, and the door is in a panelled recess. The windows are sashes in architraves, under cambered arches of gauged brick. At the rear is a doorway with a dentilled pediment on console brackets, and a staircase window with a radial head.
Milestone, Tadcaster Road (east); 53.92153°N 1.13499°W		Early 19th century (probable)	The milestone is on the south side of Tadcaster Road, and is in stone with a cast iron plaque. It has a triangular plan with a round-arched top, and is about 0.75 metres (2 ft 6 in) in height. It is inscribed around the head with "TADCASTER & HOBMOOR ROAD" and "COPMANTHORPE", on the left face are the distances to Tadcaster and Leeds, and on the right side the distance to York.
Milestone, Tadcaster Road (west); 53.91898°N 1.15874°W		Early 19th century (probable)	The milestone is on the south side of Tadcaster Road, and is in stone with a cast iron plaque. It has a triangular plan with a round-arched top, and is about 0.75 metres (2 ft 6 in) in height. It is inscribed around the head with "TADCASTER & HOBMOOR ROAD" and "ASKHAM BRYAN", on the left face are the distances to Tadcaster and Leeds, and on the right side the distance to York.
