= Catherine da Costa =

English miniature painter

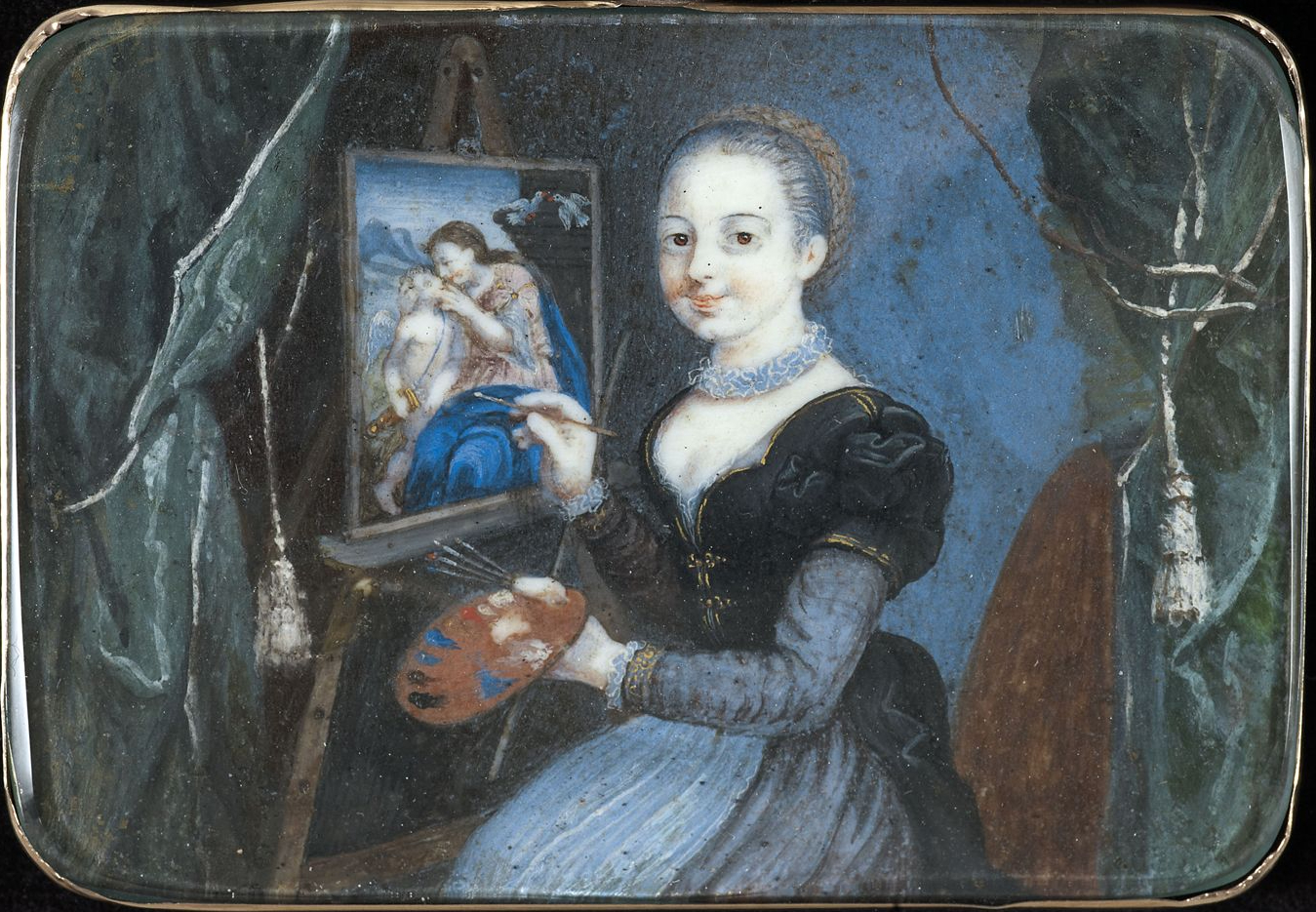
- Self-portrait attributed to Catherine da Costa
- Born: Catherine Rachel Mendes; 1679; London, England
- Died: 1756 (aged 76–77); London, England
- Other names: Catharina da Costa, Catherine Rachel da Costa
- Occupation: Miniaturist

Catherine Rachel da Costa (1679–1756), née Mendes, was an English miniaturist. She grew up in London and studied painting under Bernard Lens III. Most of her surviving portraits are of family and friends, and there is also a picture of Mary Queen of Scots. Da Costa was the first female Anglo-Jewish artist of note. In her personal life, she married Moses da Costa and had six children.

== Early life ==
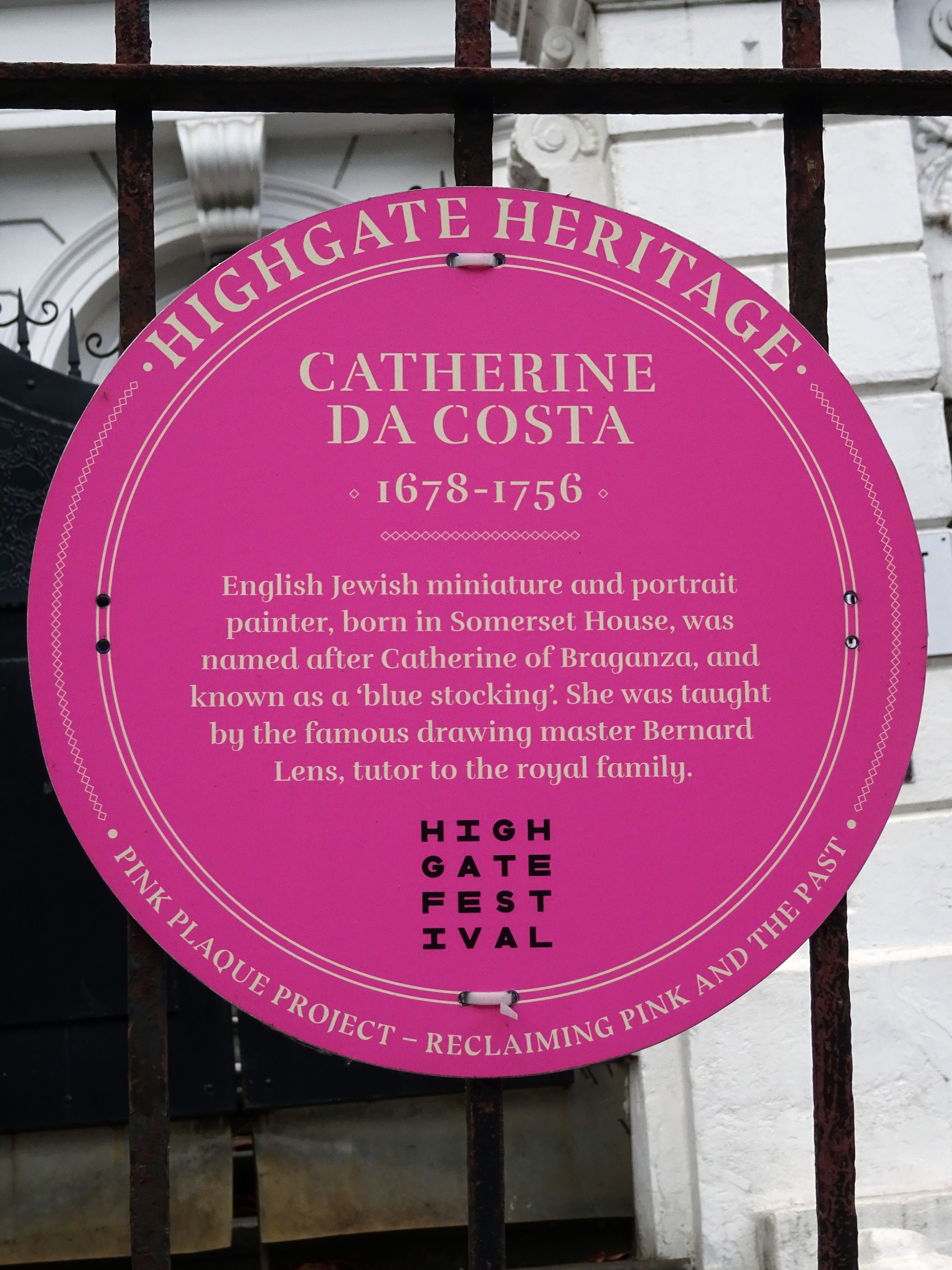
Commemorative plaque in Highgate (with date of birth as 1678, not 1679)

Catherine Rachel Mendes was the eldest daughter of Fernando and Isabel Mendes, Portuguese Jews who had fled the Spanish Inquisition and married in London. Her father was doctor to both King Charles II and Queen consort Catherine of Braganza, having converted to Roman Catholicism. Catherine Mendes was baptized at Somerset House (but given the Jewish name of Rachel) and Catherine of Braganza became her godmother.

The family lived between Budge Row in the City of London and Highgate House (later known as Cromwell House), sharing the houses with Fernando Mendes' cousin Alvaro da Costa and raising the children as Jews. On 13 August 1698, Catherine Mendes married da Costa's son Moses da Costa in a synagogue. Moses da Costa was a wealthy merchant, and together with him, Catherine da Costa had six children.

== Career ==
Catherine da Costa was taught to paint miniature portraits by Bernard Lens III and most of her surviving works are portraits of friends and family. These include a miniature of her ten-year-old son Abraham da Costa, which is now owned by the Jewish Museum. However, a full-length watercolour portrait of her father hangs in the Bevis Marks Synagogue and da Costa also painted the Imaginary Portrait of Mary, Queen of Scots (1542–1587), which hangs at Ham House in Surrey.

Da Costa was well-regarded as a painter and also impressed Voltaire with her wit when he visited London in the mid-1720s. He recorded an exchange^{a} between her and a priest in his notebooks:

Madame Acosta [sic] said in my presence to a cleric hoping to convert her to Christianity:

- "Was your God born Jewish?"
- "Yes"
- "Did he die Jewish?"
- "Yes"
- "Well then, become Jewish"

— Voltaire, Notebooks page 26

== Death and legacy ==
Catherina da Costa died on 11 December 1756 and was buried in the Mile End Jewish cemetery. Her son Abraham inherited her artworks, and some are now owned by the Joods Historisch Museum in Amsterdam. She was the first female Anglo-Jewish artist of note.

A book called Smitten by Catherine was published in 2016 about her life and work.

== Gallery ==
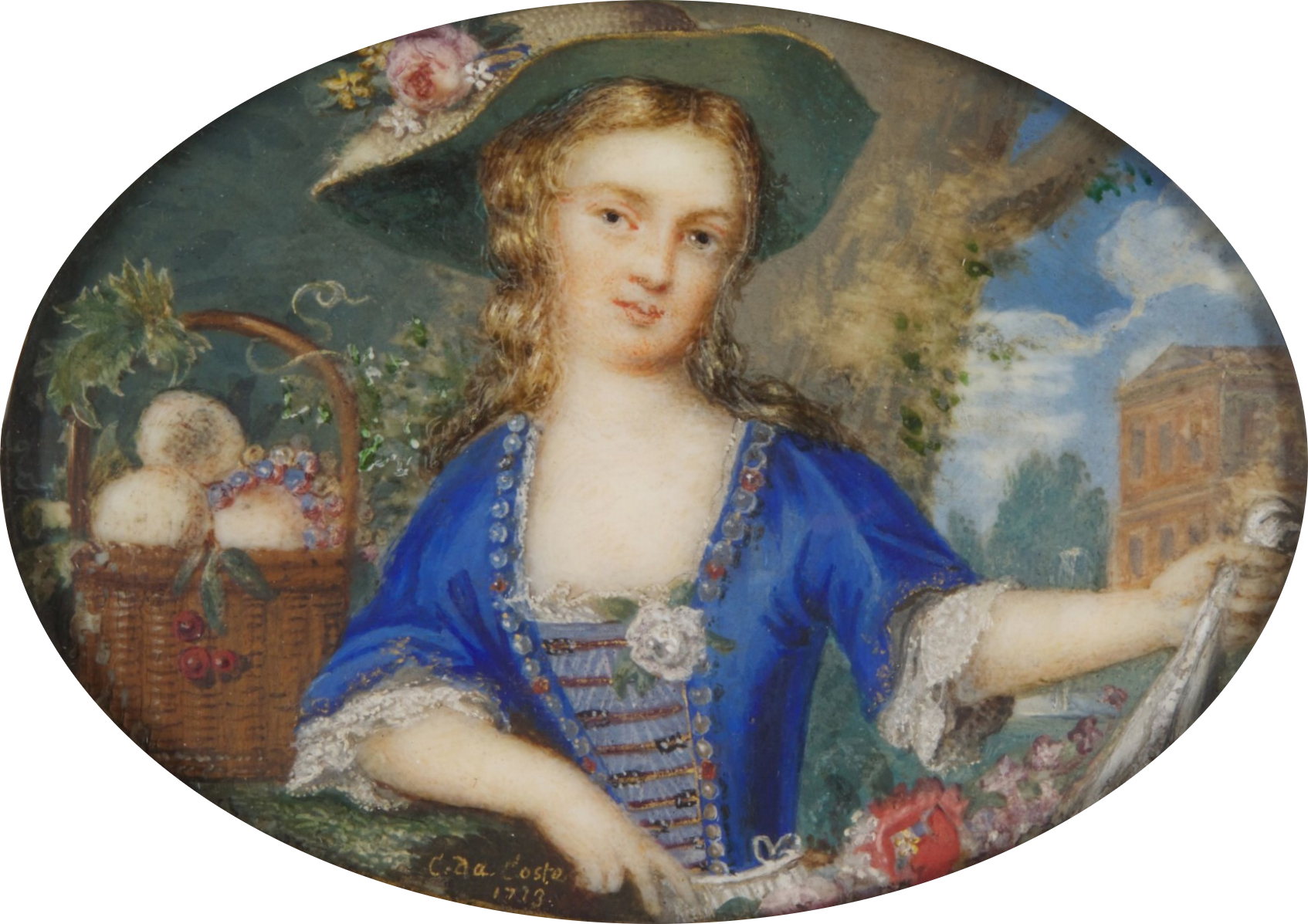
Allegory of summer, 1713

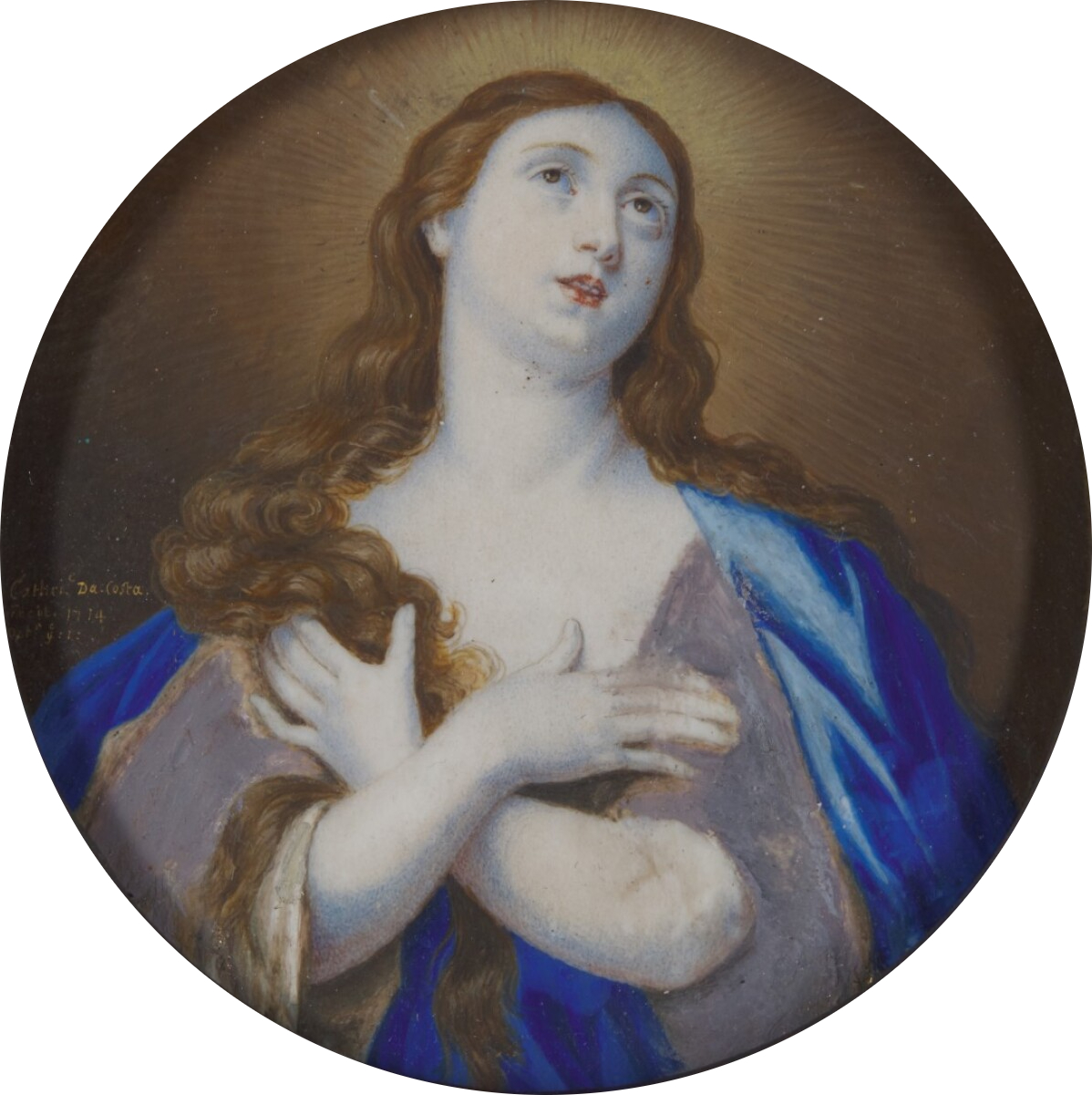
The Penitent Magdalene, 1714

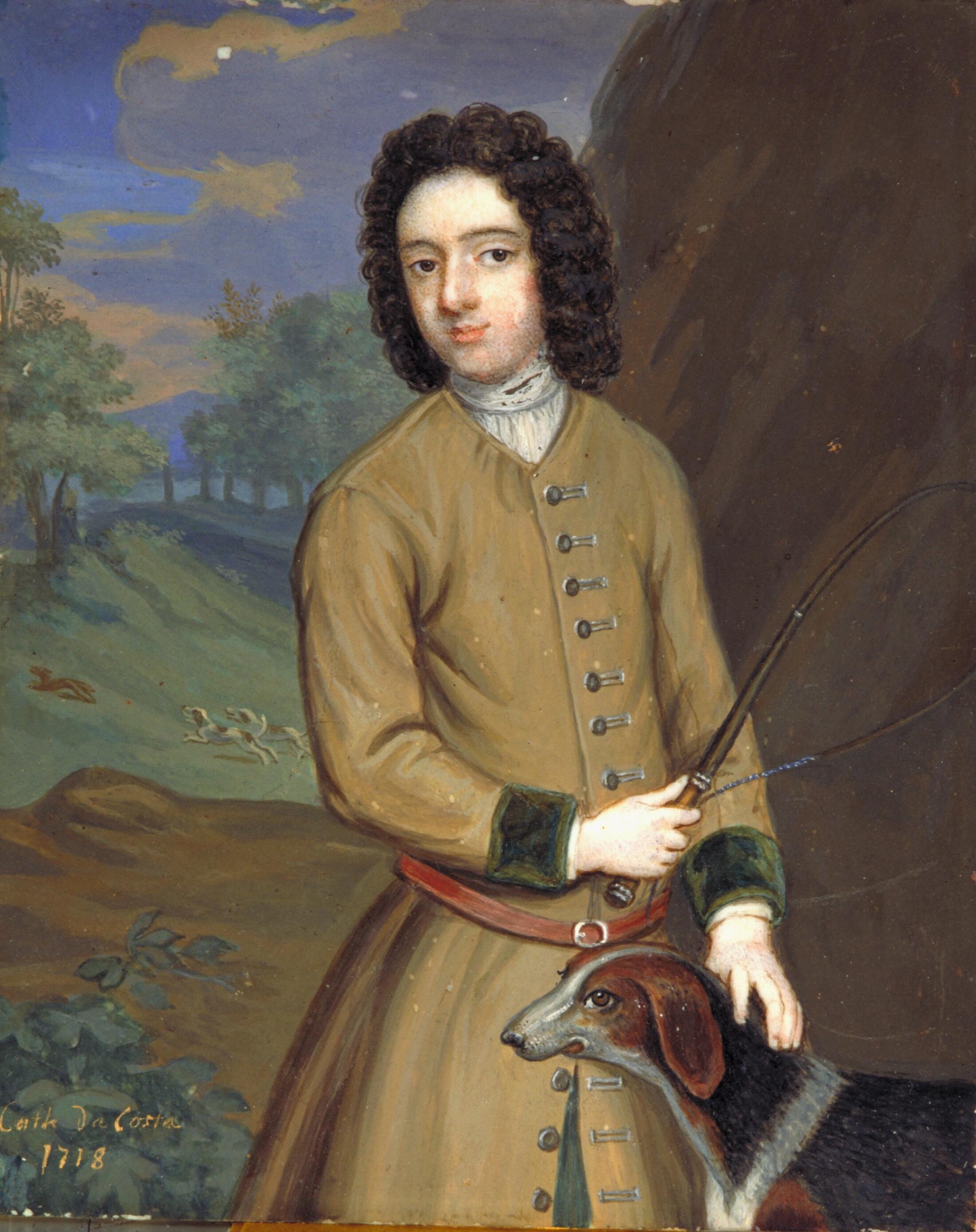
Portrait of Alvaro Lopes Suasso (1696-1751), 1718 (Joods Historisch Museum)

== Notes ==
1. ^a "Madame Acosta dit en ma presence a un abbé qui vouloit la faire chrêtienne. Votre Dieu, est il né juif? Ouy. Est il mort juif? Ouy. Eh bien soyez donc juif".
