= Listed buildings in Doddington, Kent =

Historic structures in Kent, England

Doddington is a village and civil parish in the Swale District of Kent, England. It contains 31 listed buildings that are recorded in the National Heritage List for England. Of these two are grade I and 29 are grade II.

This list is based on the information retrieved online from Historic England.

== Key ==
Grade	Criteria
I	Buildings that are of exceptional interest
II*	Particularly important buildings of more than special interest
II	Buildings that are of special interest

== Listing ==
Name	Grade	Location	Type	Completed (Note: The date given is the date used by Historic England as significant for the initial building or that of an important part in the structure's description.)	Date designated	Grid ref. (Note: The grid reference is based on the British national grid reference system, sometimes known as OSGB36, used by the Ordnance Survey.) Geo-coordinates	Notes	Entry number (Note: The "List Entry Number" is a unique number assigned to each listed building and scheduled monument by Historic England.)	Image	Wikidata
Bistock Farmhouse	II	Bistock			24 January 1967	TQ9372858411; 51°17′31″N 0°46′38″E		1335862	Upload Photo	Q26620415
Old Thatch	II	Bistock			24 January 1967	TQ9356258232; 51°17′25″N 0°46′29″E		1343898	Upload Photo	Q26627665
Church of the Beheading of St John the Baptist	I	Church Lane	church building		24 January 1967	TQ9400257582; 51°17′04″N 0°46′50″E		1087004	Church of the Beheading of St John the Baptist More images	Q17530072
Slip's Cottage	II	Church Lane			21 March 1985	TQ9387057846; 51°17′12″N 0°46′44″E		1343899	Upload Photo	Q26627666
The Old Vicarage	II	Church Lane			21 March 1985	TQ9397657548; 51°17′03″N 0°46′49″E		1086980	Upload Photo	Q26379466
Tomb of Edward Bentham, 25 Yards South West of Tower of Church of St John the Baptist	II	Church Lane			21 March 1985	TQ9396657570; 51°17′03″N 0°46′48″E		1069328	Upload Photo	Q26322224
Doddington Place with Outbuildings and Garden Terraces	II	Doddington Place			21 March 1985	TQ9436657519; 51°17′01″N 0°47′09″E		1069325	Upload Photo	Q26322217
Down Court Farmhouse	II	Down Court			21 March 1985	TQ9294157768; 51°17′11″N 0°45′56″E		1335896	Upload Photo	Q26620444
Little Sharsted Farmhouse	II	Little Sharsted			24 January 1967	TQ9440358982; 51°17′48″N 0°47′13″E		1069329	Upload Photo	Q26322226
Garden Gates, Piers and Walls at Sharsted Court	II	Sharsted Court			24 January 1967	TQ9507458127; 51°17′20″N 0°47′46″E		1087028	Upload Photo	Q26379514
Frangbury Farmhouse	II	Seed Road			21 March 1985	TQ9362856179; 51°16′19″N 0°46′28″E		1086990	Upload Photo	Q26379484
Gardener's Cottage 100 Yards North of Sharsted Court	II	Sharsted Court			21 March 1985	TQ9520358245; 51°17′24″N 0°47′53″E		1343897	Upload Photo	Q26627664
Gazebo 50 Yards South West of Sharsted Court	II	Sharsted Court			24 January 1967	TQ9504858134; 51°17′20″N 0°47′45″E		1069327	Upload Photo	Q26322221
Sharsted Court	I	Sharsted Court	English country house		24 January 1967	TQ9511958174; 51°17′21″N 0°47′49″E		1335856	Sharsted Court More images	Q7490484
Stables and Outhouses 10 Yards North of Sharsted Court	II	Sharsted Court			21 March 1985	TQ9516058202; 51°17′22″N 0°47′51″E		1069326	Upload Photo	Q26322219
Homestall Farmhouse	II	Stuppington Lane			21 March 1985	TQ9578259205; 51°17′54″N 0°48′25″E		1069334	Upload Photo	Q26322237
Stables 30 Yards North of Homestall Farmhouse	II	Stuppington Lane			21 March 1985	TQ9577259241; 51°17′55″N 0°48′25″E		1334366	Upload Photo	Q26619037
Solomon's Temple	II	Temple			21 March 1985	TQ9291456264; 51°16′22″N 0°45′51″E		1343903	Upload Photo	Q26627670
Barn 25 Yards East of Court Lodge Farmhouse	II	The Street			21 March 1985	TQ9326257232; 51°16′53″N 0°46′11″E		1335881	Upload Photo	Q26620432
Court Lodge Farmhouse	II	The Street			24 January 1967	TQ9323357211; 51°16′53″N 0°46′10″E		1069332	Upload Photo	Q26322232
Laurel Farmhouse	II	The Street			24 January 1967	TQ9321157180; 51°16′52″N 0°46′08″E		1343902	Upload Photo	Q26627669
Old Gardens and Garden Walls to Rear	II	The Street			21 March 1985	TQ9394757332; 51°16′56″N 0°46′47″E		1069330	Upload Photo	Q26322228
Park Cottage	II	The Street			21 March 1985	TQ9396257331; 51°16′56″N 0°46′47″E		1343900	Upload Photo	Q26627667
Saddlers	II	The Street			24 January 1967	TQ9348257228; 51°16′53″N 0°46′23″E		1069333	Upload Photo	Q26322234
South View	II	The Street			21 March 1985	TQ9346757263; 51°16′54″N 0°46′22″E		1343901	Upload Photo	Q26627668
The Chequers Inn	II	The Street	pub		24 January 1967	TQ9351357275; 51°16′54″N 0°46′24″E		1069331	The Chequers Inn More images	Q26322230
The Old Corner House	II	The Street			21 March 1985	TQ9347657260; 51°16′54″N 0°46′22″E		1335890	Upload Photo	Q26620439
The Old House	II	The Street			24 January 1967	TQ9374657335; 51°16′56″N 0°46′36″E		1086960	Upload Photo	Q26379424
Walnut Tree Cottage Walnut Tree House	II	The Street			24 January 1967	TQ9329057178; 51°16′51″N 0°46′13″E		1086956	Upload Photo	Q26379406
Yew Tree House	II	The Street			24 January 1967	TQ9328857202; 51°16′52″N 0°46′12″E		1086940	Upload Photo	Q26379336

== See also ==
- Grade I listed buildings in Kent
- Grade II* listed buildings in Kent

== Sources ==
- Newman, John (2013) [1969], Kent: North-East and East, The Buildings of England, New Haven and London: Yale University Press, ISBN 978-0-300-18506-5
