= Sharsted Court =

Coordinates: 51°17′29.45″N 0°48′15.19″E

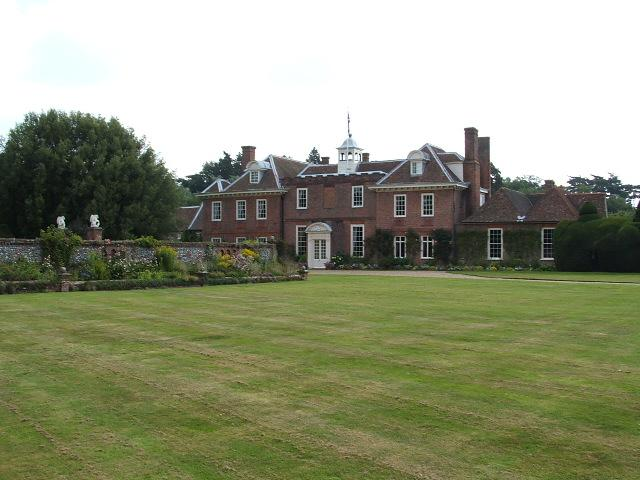
- North-west elevation
- Interactive map of the Sharsted Court area

General information
- Architectural style: Medieval and Neoclassical
- Location: Newnham, England
- Construction started: 11th century

Technical details
- Structural system: Timber-framing and brick

Sharsted Court is a grade I listed manor house set in woodland near the village of Newnham, Kent (in the parish of Doddington) England. A house or lodge has been recorded at the site since the time of Odo de Bayeux in 1080, however the present building, exhibiting a number of later styles, principally dates from the 18th century. Earlier residents of the site may have included Iron Age settlers since excavations of earthworks on the estate in 1825 and 1880 revealed evidence of possible Belgic fortifications.

== History ==
According to Edward Hasted, the 18th-century historian of Kent, the manor then known as Sahersted formed part of the estate of Odo de Bayeux at the time of his fall from grace in 1080. It is not known what type of structure existed on the site at that time however the building is within ancient woodland and may have been a mediaeval lodge.

The manor of Sharsted was recorded in 1174 as a subsidiary manor within the Hundred of Teynham and held directly from the Archbishop of Canterbury. During the reign of Edward I the manor was in the possession of John de Sharsted and then Sir Simon de Sharsted. A Simon de Sharsted is also noted as having been imprisoned in the Tower of London. Robert de Sharsted is recorded in the Kent Hundred Rolls of 1275 as a sheriff of the Lathe of Faversham, and an early tomb in the Sharsted Chapel in the church at Doddington) bears the name of 'Richard de Sharsted' dating his death to 1287.

Robert de Sharsted died in 1320 leaving only a daughter as an heir. The property transferred then to John de Bourne of Down Court, Doddington - whose father was Sheriff under Edward III. According to some sources, Sharsted was at that time occupied by Robert de Nottingham. It is speculated that John de Bourne was one of the knights known to have held Leeds Castle against Edward II in 1314 and, as a result, his lands were forfeited to the Crown. They were restored by Edward III in 1327 with the exception of Sharsted Court. The widow of Robert de Nottingham (who died in 1374 and is presumed to have been allowed to keep Sharsted until his death) was left a section of the house.

During the reign of Henry VI, Bartholomew de Bourne inherited Sharsted Court, which continued in the Bourne family for the next two hundred years. According to Hasted, early in the 17th century James Bourne conveyed the estate to Abraham Delaune, the son of Gideon Delaune, a Huguenot apothecary in the service of King James I's wife, Ann of Denmark, and founding benefactor of the Worshipful Society of Apothecaries. Abraham's grandson, Colonel William Delaune (afterwards MP for Kent from 1715 to 1722) transformed Sharsted in 1711 adding the brick front and the gazebo at the end of the raised terrace.

Since Colonel Delaune had no children of his own, Sharsted passed to his nephew, Gideon Thornicroft, in 1739. Just three years later Thornicroft died, leaving the property to his mother. Again, just two years later, she bequeathed the estate on her death to her two unmarried daughters, Dorcas and Elizabeth. On 1759 Dorcas left Sharsted to the great-grandson of Sir William Delaune, Alured Pincke. The property subsequently passed to Alured's wife; in 1839, Mary Pincke bequeathed Sharsted to her great-nephew, Captain Edmund Faunce, who is noted in Bernard Burke's Genealogical and Heraldic Dictionary of the Landed Gentry of Great Britain as Edmund Faunce of Sharsted. In 1864, his son Chapman Faunce added 'Delaune' to his surname and changed the spelling to Faunce-De-Laune. It is Chapman Faunce-De-Laune who is believed to have begun the yew topiary that still exists today. During the late 19th century tobacco was grown on the property, which was also depicted in prints in the Illustrated London News. By the early 20th century, Sharsted Court was recorded in the Sittingbourne, Milton and District Directory of 1908 as being "a typical English park of some 250 acres".

By 1949 however the property was empty. Alured Faunce De Laune died around that time leaving the property to a son in South Africa who declined it due to the expense of maintaining the property from afar. The Ratzer family bought it during the 1950s, but, in common with a number of large country estates which became expensive to maintain, the house was at risk of being demolished. However, in 1966 the Court came into the possession of Canon Wade and his son Anthony Wade whose family included Virginia Wade, Wimbledon tennis champion in 1977. As of 2007, the house remains in the hands of the Wade and Shepley families who have undertaken extensive restoration of the house and gardens. The house was also licensed for civil weddings in Kent and provided occasional conference facilities. Sharsted Court no longer holds these functions and the last of the weddings took place in 2008.

== Architecture ==
=== Main house ===
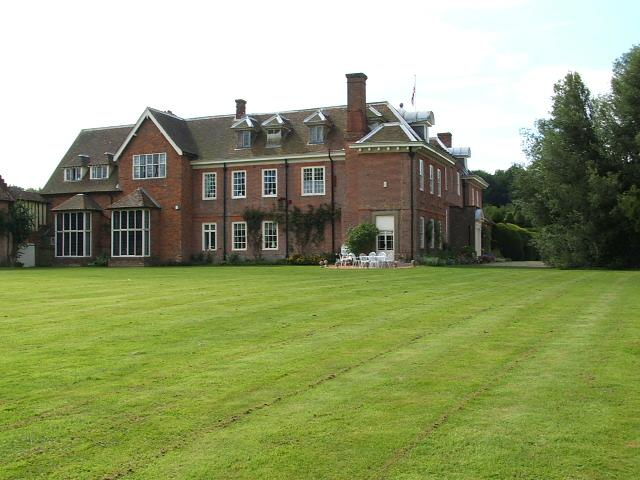
North-east elevation

The main house is built around a two-storey mediæval hall house possibly dating to the 14th century. This rectangular hall was heated by an open fireplace and features an arched roof with extensive oak beams and rafters. The south-west of the property is timber-framed and is believed to date also to the mid-14th century and possibly to have been used as a 'dowager wing' of the main hall by the widow of Robert de Nottingham.

In 1711 a brick front was added to the main hall house, and two wings with tiled roofs, wooden cornice work and large dormers. The grand centre section of the building includes imitation battlements and a working belfry (believed to have been used previously to call workers on the estate). The pedimented entrance porch includes a coat-of-arms.

During the 19th century an additional three-storey Victorian wing was built, squaring off the existing buildings and creating a central courtyard. However this imposing structure was demolished in 1967 for aesthetic reasons; a conservatory was appended to the remaining Victorian east wing in 1987.

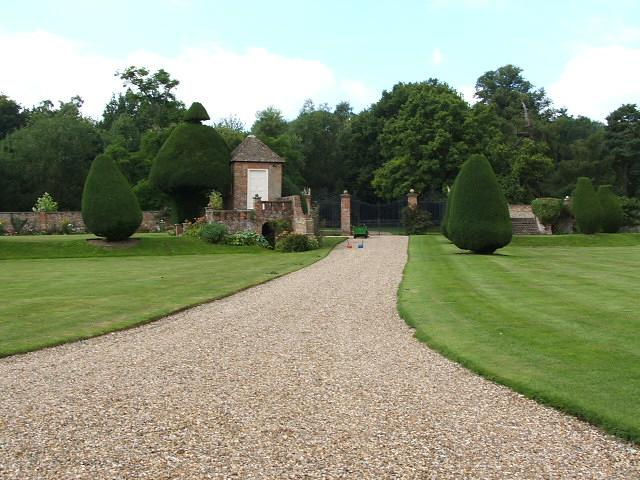
Driveway viewed from the main house

The house includes a so-called "drunken" staircase (on account of its unorthodox angles), which is reputedly "the 13th stairway to be constructed in the house, leading to the 79th room". In common with a number of old manor houses in England, the house also contains a "secret" passageway via a cleverly marked panel in the wainscoting of the 'Tapestry Dressing-room': "which communicates by a very narrow and steep flight of steps in the thickness of the wall with 'the Red Bedroom'." It has been speculated by the current owners that this was installed and used by one of the previous male owners to travel secretly between bed chambers for romantic liaisons.

A number of additional cottage buildings and ancillary structures (such as former stables) exist on the site and incorporate similar styles to the main house. The property is Grade I listed.

=== Garden and features ===
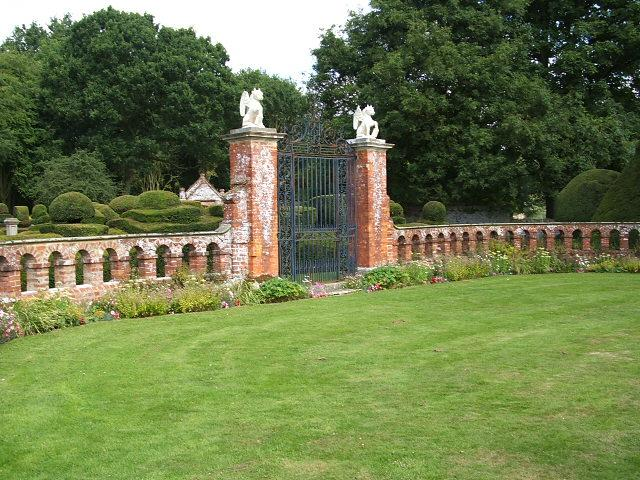
Gated entrance to topiary garden

A feature of the house today is its grand approach. After climbing a short hill from the village of Newnham, a tree-lined avenue leads to a pair of heavy wrought iron gates designed in 1882 and supported by brick gate posts. A brick 18th century gazebo (or possibly a faux gatehouse) watches over the entrance together with two stone bulls. A gravel stone driveway leads to the main, house flanked on the south by a walled terrace from the gazebo.

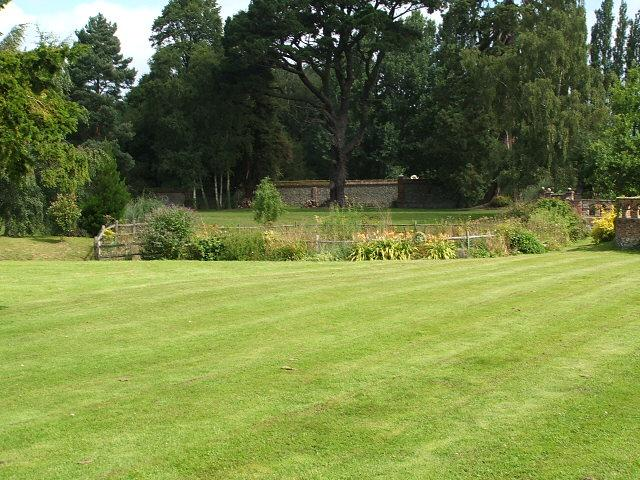
A sunken pond and ancient trees feature in the grounds

Clipped yews line the driveway and are featured in the main gardens, which are surrounded by flint and brick walls; a small maze-like topiary display section is enclosed by a low wall and principally entered through wrought iron gates guarded by stone gryphons. Side entrances to the topiary section include an extravagant archway in the south-west wall.

The garden is extensively planted with roses and traditional bedding flowers. Resting places, stepped terraces and ornate recesses are incorporated into the brick garden walls. A flint and brick circular summer house with a pointed tile roof sits in the far north corner and a raised terrace leads to a heavy wooden door in the far north wall. The north and west sides of the garden are bordered by woodland (part of Sharsted Wood) and a number of ancient trees are preserved within the grounds themselves. A small sunken pond also exists to the north of the house.
