= St Giles' Church, Copmanthorpe =

Grade II listed church in York, England

Coordinates: 53°54′54″N 1°08′28″W

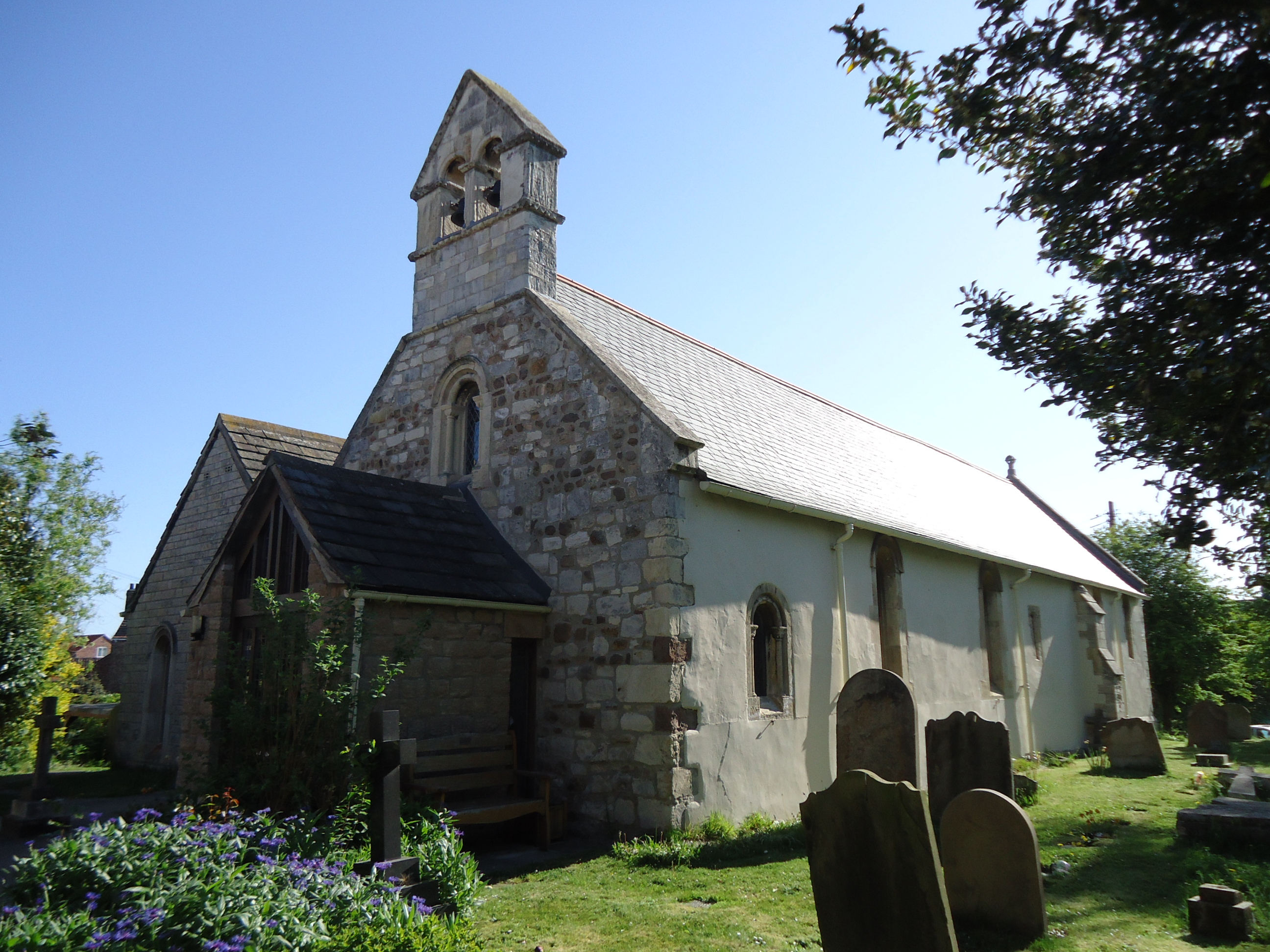
The church, from the south west, in 2011

St Giles' Church is the parish church of Copmanthorpe, a suburban village in the southern part of the City of York district, in the ceremonial county of North Yorkshire, England. It is a Grade II listed building.

The church was built in about 1180, as a chapel in the parish of St Mary Bishophill Junior. The churchyard was enclosed in 1750. In 1844, it was moved to a new parish of Copmanthorpe and Upper Poppleton, and from 1866 it had its own parish. In 1848, the church was described as "a small plain building".

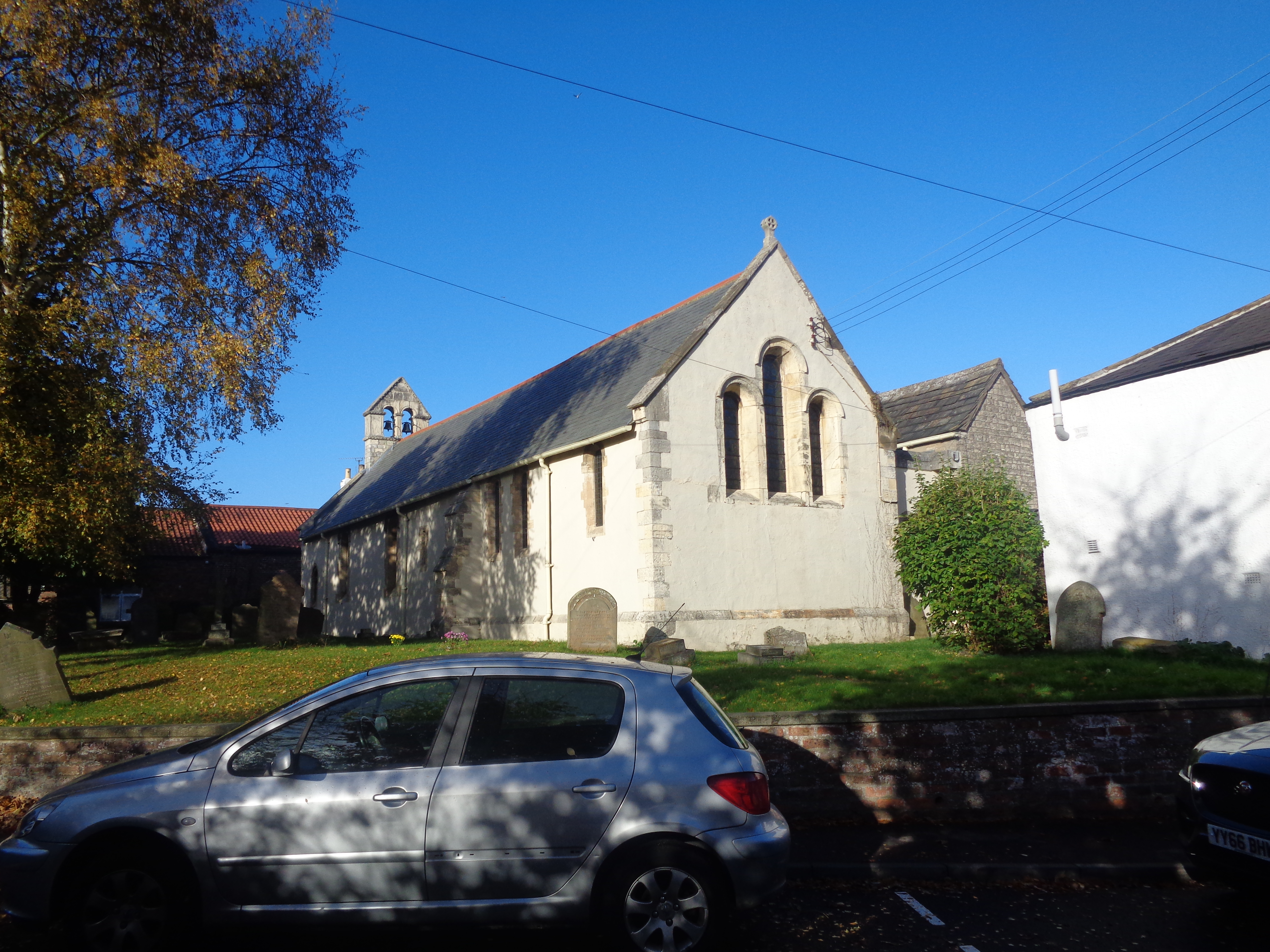
The church, from the south-east, in 2017

The church was restored in 1889 by C. Hodgson Fowler. He added a vestry and an organ chamber, new flooring, seating, and a staircase to the existing gallery. He also rebuilt some of the walls and added a chancel, with the east end of the church relocated to form the east end of the new chancel. He moved the panelling from the nave to the chancel, and re-panelled the nave with the old seating, although this was removed, probably in 1916 when the gallery was taken down. A porch and new vestry were added in 1977, and the St Giles' Centre parish hall was added on the north side in 1992. In 2013, a narthex was added at the west end, including toilets and a kitchen, and the chancel was rearranged.

The church is built of Magnesian Limestone, some of which is covered with render. 12th century features include the main doorway and the bell turret. Most of the windows are single round-arch structures of early date. The east window contains stained glass designed by Charles Eamer Kempe and was installed in 1889.

== See also ==
- Listed buildings in Copmanthorpe
- Saint Giles
