= Moses da Costa =

English banker (??–1747)

Moses Mendes da Costa (died 1747), also called Anthony da Costa, was an English banker.

In 1727, Costa brought an action against the Russia Company, which refused to admit him to membership on the ground of his being a Jew. The attorney-general decided that he must be admitted, whereupon the company petitioned Parliament to modify the former's charter so as to give it the right of refusal.

== Background and family ==
He was the son of Jacob (Alvarez or Álvaro) da Costa, who is probably the da Costa referred to in the Thurlow Papers. Jacob da Costa arrived in England with his family in 1655 and in 1675 a member of the family bought Cromwell House in Highgate. He married Leonora (Rachel) Mendes, sister of Fernandez (Fernando) Mendes, the Marrano physician of King John IV of Portugal.

Moses married his cousin Catherine Mendes in 1698. Catherine had been baptized in Somerset House and was named after Catherine of Braganza, wife of King Charles II. Catherine da Costa made the water-colour portrait of her father which now hangs in the vestry of the Bevis Marks Synagogue. Their children included Sarah (Simha) Mendes da Costa who married Ephraim Lópes Pereira d'Aguilar, 2nd Baron d'Aguilar.

== See also ==
- Sampson Gideon
- Antonio Fernandez Carvajal
- Samuel Nunez
