= Hooke baronets =

Extinct English baronetcy

Hooke Baronetcy was a title in the Baronetage of England of Flanchford in the Surrey. It was created on 22 July 1662 (363 years ago) for Thomas Hooke. The title became extinct following the death of the second Baronet in 1712 (314 years ago).

== Hooke baronets, of Flanchford ==
- Sir Thomas Hooke, 1st Baronet (1641–1678)
- Sir Hele Hooke, 2nd Baronet (c. 1665–1712)
