= Doddington, Kent =

Village in Kent, England

Coordinates: 51.2815°N 0.773°E

Doddington
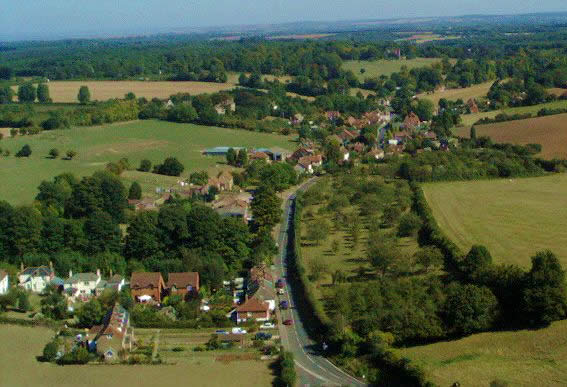
- Aerial photo of Doddington

- Location within Kent
- Population: 557
- OS grid reference: TQ 934572
- District: Swale
- Shire county: Kent
- Region: South East
- Country: England
- Sovereign state: United Kingdom
- Post town: Sittingbourne
- Postcode district: ME9
- Dialling code: 01795
- Police: Kent
- Fire: Kent
- Ambulance: South East Coast
- UK Parliament: Faversham and Mid Kent

Doddington is a village and civil parish in the district of Swale in Kent, England. The Syndale Valley shelters the central part in the Kent Downs Area of outstanding natural beauty. Today the village is notable for Doddington Place Gardens, for its remarkably well kept buildings and its house prices show higher prices than the home counties average.

== History ==
Within the parish at Sharsted Court, earthworks excavated were believed remains of an Iron Age Belgic Fort (100 BC – 43 AD). However the current village settlement dates from the 11th century.

Of particular note is Doddington Church with the unusual dedication of "The (decollation) Beheading of St. John the Baptist". The dedication dates from at least 1467 when it is referenced in a will.

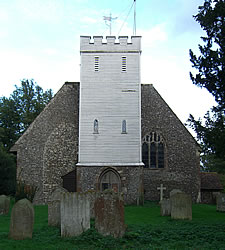
Doddington Church 2006

Other notable buildings within the parish are: Doddington Place built in 1870 for the Croft family (of 'Croft original sherry' fame) who owned it until 1906 when the Jeffreys and Oldfied families jointly purchased it. It is still owned by the Oldfield family and the Doddington Place Gardens are open to the public and have achieved listed status; in its grounds are the Place, a much-altered house, Park House and Park Cottage, also listed with fascinating history, as Grade II.

== Attractions and amenities ==
Within the parish just 500 metres (1,600 ft) to the north east is Sharsted Court, a Medieval Wealden hall house distinctive of this area, the Weald, however a building on the site dates from at least 1080; today a large romantic rambling manor house due to the many additions and alterations over the centuries. It is owned by former Wimbledon champion Virginia Wade.

The village has an award-winning butchers shop, Doughty's, owned by the Doughty family since 1919 (and a butchers shop since 1789), with its own slaughter house.

The village has a strong community spirit with numerous clubs and groups, which include as of 2013: An allotments association, amateur dramatics (The Valley Players), singing (Cantiana), parent/toddler group (Buddies), health and fitness (Medau) and tied in with the neighbouring village of Newnham, folk dancing, Women's Institute and brownies groups.

== See also ==
- Listed buildings in Doddington, Kent
