= William Delaune (physician) =

French physician and minister

- Died: 1610
- Occupations: Physician and minister

William Delaune (died 1610) was a French Huguenot physician and minister.

== Biography ==
Delaune was a native of France, where he became a Protestant minister. He also studied medicine for eight years at Paris and Montpelier under Duretus and Rondeletius. Being obliged to leave his country on account of religion, he came to England, and on 7 December 1582 he was summoned before the College of Physicians for practising medicine in London without a license. As he stated many extenuating circumstances, the consideration of his case was postponed, and on the 22nd of the same month he was admitted a licentiate of the college. He practised chiefly in London, but was living in the university of Cambridge in 1583. He was buried at St. Anne's, Blackfriars, on 19 February 1610. His eldest son, Gideon Delaune, became the king's apothecary.

He was the author of ‘Institutionis Christianæ Religionis a Joanne Calvino conscriptæ Epitome. In qua adversariorum objectionibus responsiones annotantur,’ London, 1583, 1584, 8vo. Dedicated to Sir Richard Martin, master of the mint and alderman of London. An English translation by Christopher Fetherstone, minister of the word of God, appeared at Edinburgh about 1585, 8vo.
