= Copmanthorpe =

Village and civil parish in North Yorkshire, England

Coordinates: 53°54′56″N 1°08′22″W

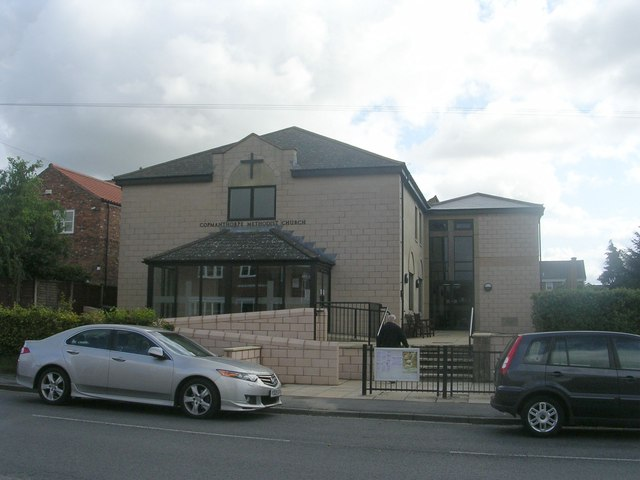
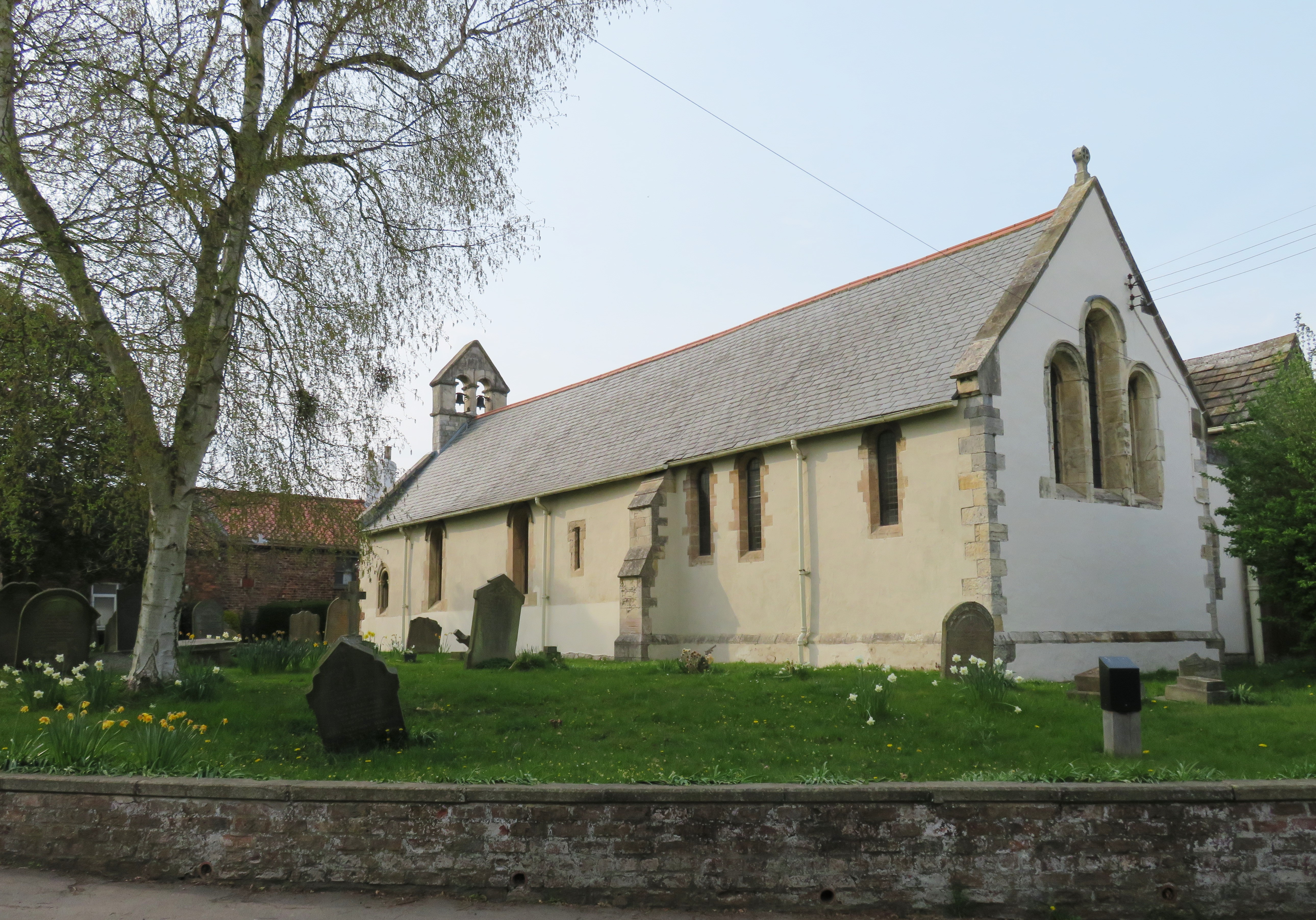
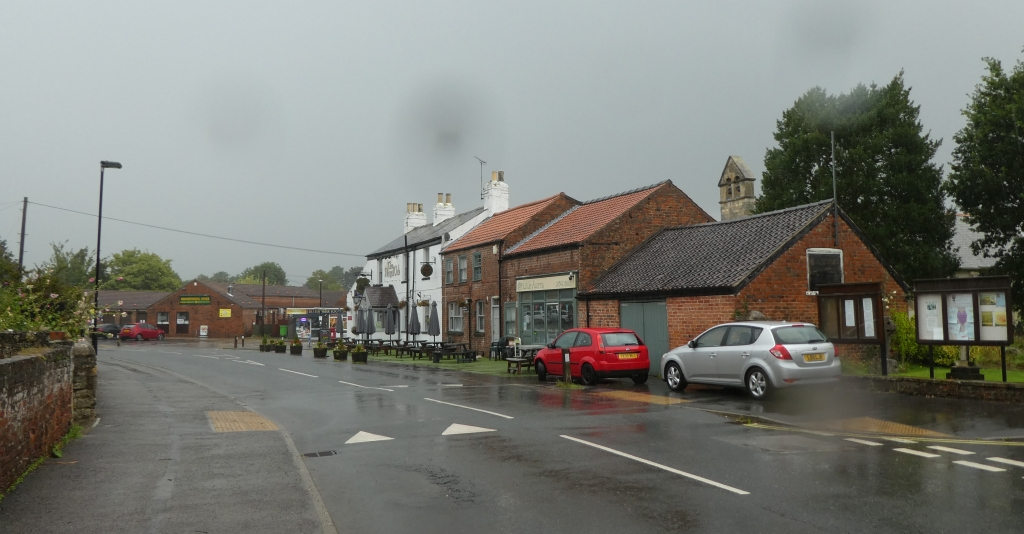
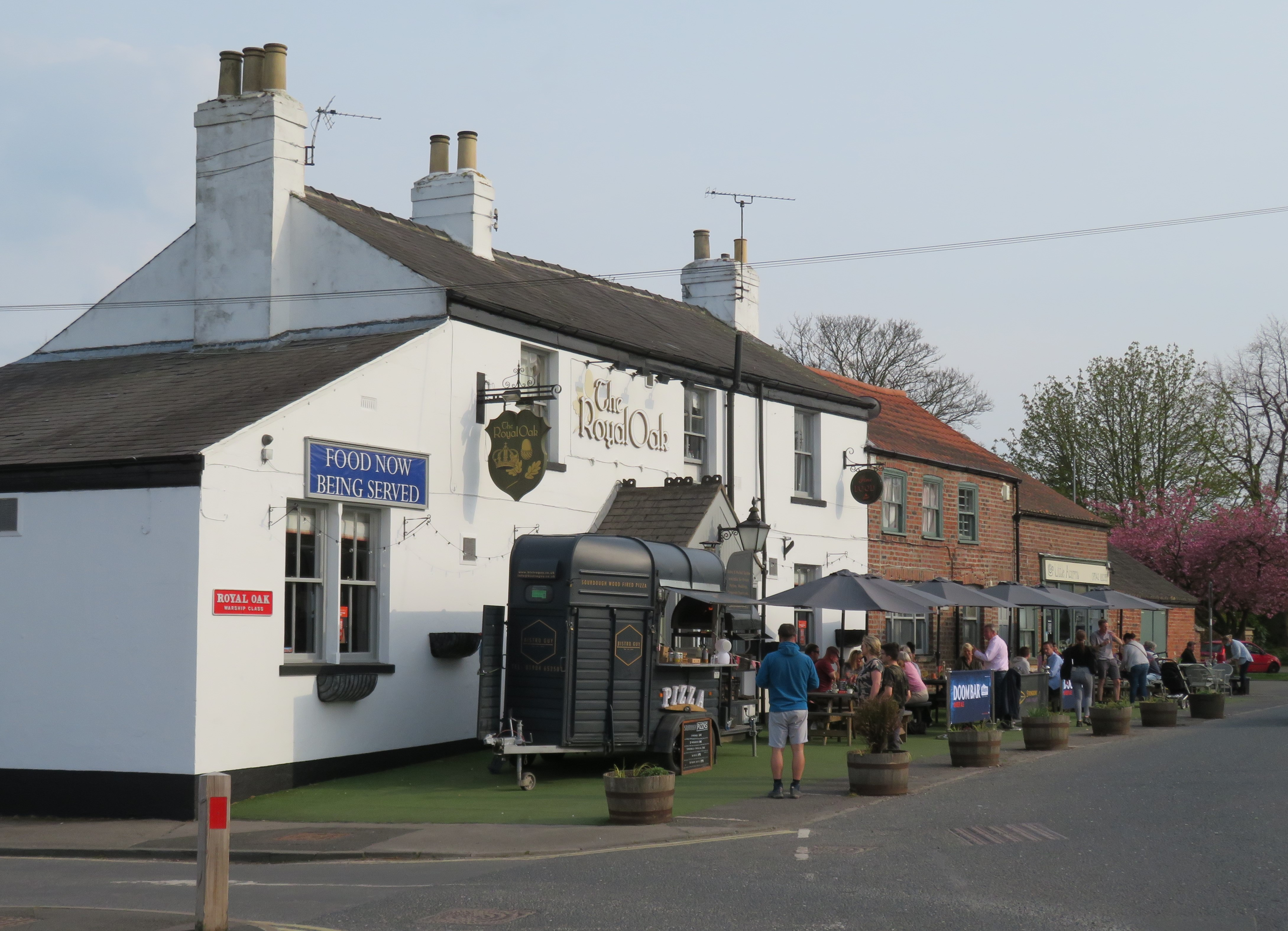
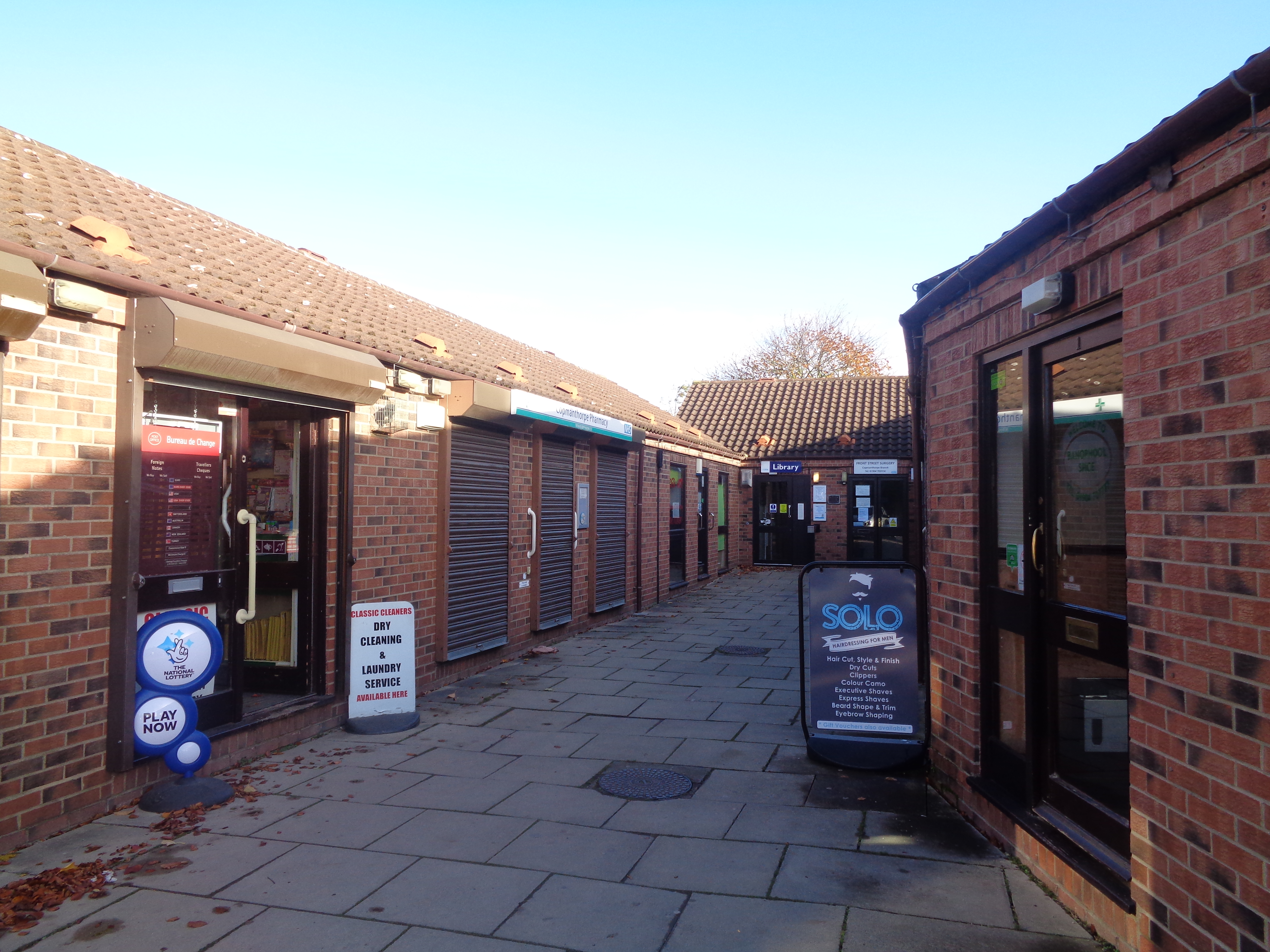
- Methodist Church St Giles Church Main Street The Royal Oak The Shops

- Location within North Yorkshire
- Population: 4,173 (2011 census)
- OS grid reference: SE 57 47
- Civil parish: Copmanthorpe
- Unitary authority: City of York
- Ceremonial county: North Yorkshire
- Region: Yorkshire and the Humber
- Country: England
- Sovereign state: United Kingdom
- Post town: YORK
- Postcode district: YO23
- Dialling code: 01904
- Police: North Yorkshire
- Fire: North Yorkshire
- Ambulance: Yorkshire
- UK Parliament: York Outer

Copmanthorpe (/ˈkɒpmənˌθɔːrp/) is a village and civil parish in the City of York in the English county of North Yorkshire, 4 miles (6.4 km) south-west of York, west of Bishopthorpe and close to Acaster Malbis, Askham Bryan and Askham Richard. According to the 2001 Census the parish had a population of 4,262, reducing to 4,173 at the 2011 Census.

The village was historically part of the West Riding of Yorkshire until 1974. It was then a part of the district of Selby District in North Yorkshire from 1974 until 1996. Since 1996 it has been part of the City of York unitary authority. The village is part of the York Outer constituency.

The village is mentioned in the Domesday Book of 1086 as Copemantorp, from Old Norse Kaupmanna þorp, meaning Traders' Village or Craftsmen's Village. The area of Copmanthorpe covering Main Street, Church Street and Low Green became a Conservation Area in 1978.

Copmanthorpe is bounded to the north by the A64, while the East Coast Main Line runs through its south-east periphery; to the west lies open countryside.

== History ==
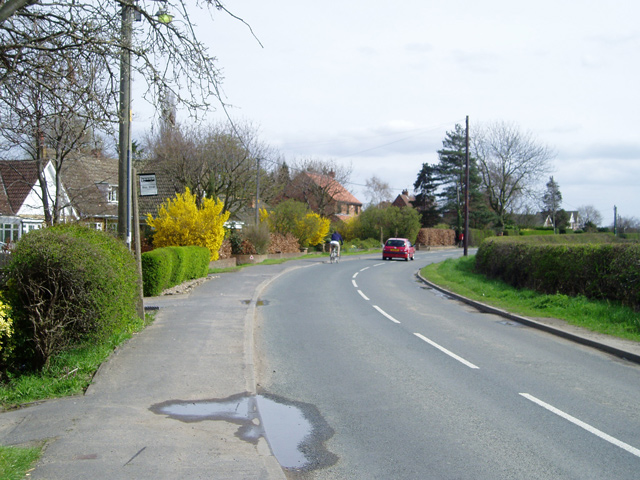
Temple Lane, near the site of Copmanthorpe Preceptory

The Roman road from York (Eboracum) to Tadcaster (Calcaria) runs to the north of the village centre, along what are now Top Lane, Hallcroft Lane and Colton Lane.

It is recorded that the Lord of Copmanthorpe Manor was an Anglo-Saxon, named Gospatrick, at the time of the Norman Conquest of England. According to the Domesday Book of 1086, the title was handed to Erneis de Burun in 1084, when he became Sheriff of Yorkshire.

Members of the Vavasour family were resident in the village from the 17th until the 20th century. A William Vavasour of Copmanthorpe is recorded in the Battle Abbey Roll. The Vavasour family were the holders of the Barotnetcy of Haselwood near Tadcaster from 1628, which included estates in Killingthorpe, Spalington and Copmanthorpe. Sir William Vavasour was the first and only Baronet of Copmanthorpe in 1643 until his death in 1659 and was the son of the Knight Marshall, Sir Thomas Vavasour. In 1672 the manor was sold to the Wood family.

Escutcheon of Sprignell Baronets of Coppenthorp (1641)

Copmanthorpe was the site of a preceptory of the Knights Templar, on land given to the Templar Knights by the Malbis family (see Acaster Malbis). A Preceptor, Robert de Reygate, of the Temple is recorded as early as 1291.

During the First World War, there was a Royal Flying Corps airfield near to Drome Road. The 57 (Cheltenham) Squadron was formed here in June 1916. In 1919, one of the huts from the aerodrome was bought by Yearsley Bridge Hospital (a fever hospital), in the north of York, to provide additional nurses' accommodation.

A railway accident occurred on 25 September 2006, when the 14:25 Plymouth to Edinburgh Virgin Cross Country service collided with a car that had veered off Moor Lane and onto the tracks, killing the car driver and causing the front carriage of the Voyager train set to derail. The accident happened at approximately 21:01 BST. The train involved was already running late on its journey towards York.

== Governance ==
Originally, the village was part of the Rural West Ward of the Unitary Authority of the City of York. As of 2015 it is a one councillor ward. It is currently represented on the City Council by Councillor Chris Steward who gained the councillorship from independent councillor and former Conservative Party colleague David Carr, who was the leader of the City Council from May 2016 to January 2018.

=== Copmanthorpe Local Election Results 2023 ===
| Candidate | Party | Votes | % |
|---|---|---|---|
| Chris Steward | Conservative | 421 | 29.0 |
| David Carr | Independent | 388 | 26.8 |
| Richard Charles Alfred Brown | Liberal Democrats | 255 | 17.6 |
| Ann Hilary Moxon | Labour | 198 | 13.7 |
| Lars Kramm | Green | 187 | 12.9 |
| Turnout | 43.6% | | |

=== Copmanthorpe Local Election Results 2019 ===
| Candidate | Party | Votes | % |
|---|---|---|---|
| David Carr | Independent | 662 | 46.2 |
| Matthew Freckelton | Conservative | 258 | 18.0 |
| Richard Brown | Liberal Democrat | 254 | 17.7 |
| Lars Kramm | Green | 159 | 11.1 |
| William Owen | Labour | 99 | 6.9 |
| Turnout | 42.9 % | | |

=== Copmanthorpe Local Election Results 2015 ===
| Candidate | Party | Votes | % |
|---|---|---|---|
| David Carr | Conservative | 1,339 | 50.2 |
| Richard Brown | Liberal Democrat | 689 | 26.0 |
| David Horton | Labour | 442 | 16.7 |
| Jennifer Aitken | Green | 184 | 6.9 |
| Turnout | 75.7 % | | |

Copmanthorpe Parish Council consists of 10 Parish Councillors. It manages the village's burial ground and allotments and is represented on the Recreation Centre committee, the Youth Club committee and the Drainage Board. It runs the annual Coronation Cup Gardening Competition and the Chapman Andrews Annual Photographic Competition and works closely with the local Police Team on law enforcement matters.

== Geography ==
Copmanthorpe lies 4 miles south-west of York city centre. The village lies on glacial moraine of sandstone overlain with boulder clay. The highest point of the village is on Top Lane at 81 feet above sea level. The village has two greens, Low Green and the smaller Memorial Green.

== Demography ==
The population of the village has almost trebled over the past hundred years since the first census in 1881, rising from 311 in 1881 to 1,027 in 1961. In the 2001 census the village parish notes the population as 4,262. The largest Age Group within the population, 30.5% between 45 and 64 years old with 26.1% were between 30 and 44 years old. Of the population aged between 16 and 74 years old, 69.3% declared they were in some form of employment and 25.3% said they were retired. Of the 1,699 households, 35% were Semi-Detached or terraced and 64.3% were Detached. The level of household ownership was 91%.

== Economy ==
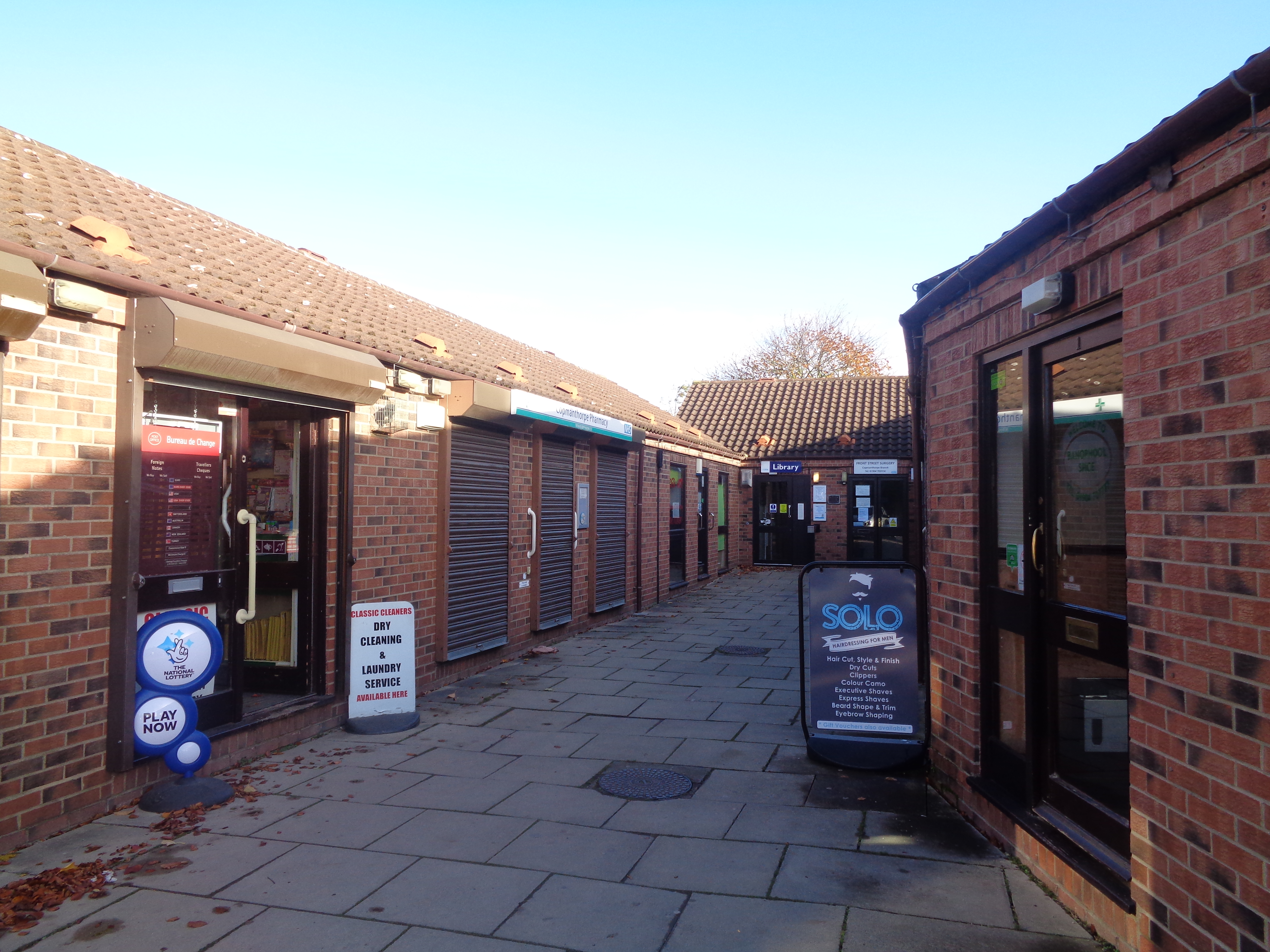
Copmanthorpe's small shopping precinct

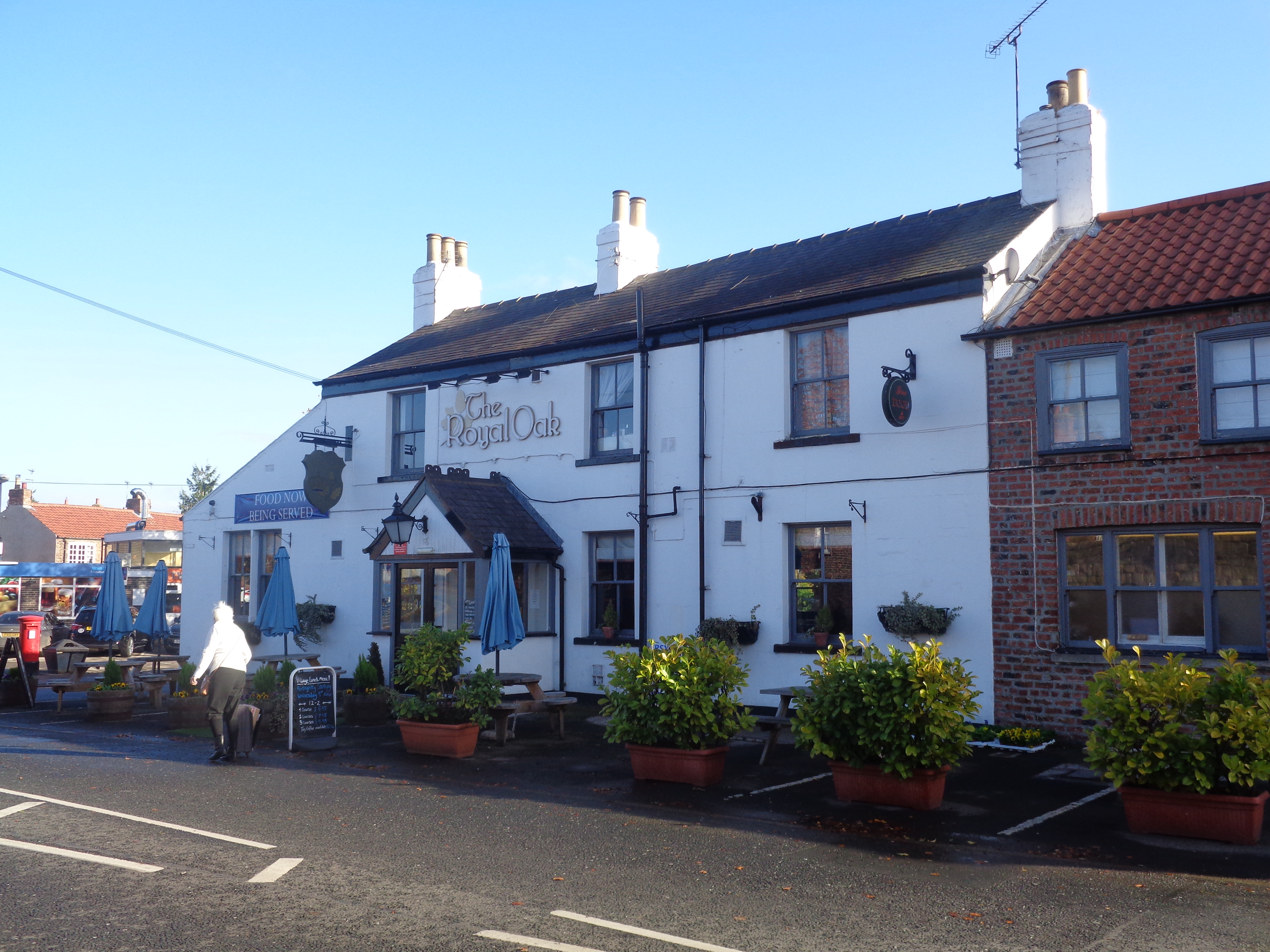
The Royal Oak

Originally the village was a place for tradesmen and farming, but currently Copmanthorpe is a functional commuter village, with two churches, a post office, a library, two coffee shops, two hair dresser's, a barber's, a pharmacy, two convenience stores, one pub and several takeaways.

== Culture and community ==
Copmanthorpe Recreation Centre ("the Rec") provides most of the sporting and many of the social facilities in the village. It is a registered charity for the benefit of the whole village. There is also a children's play area with a variety of equipment on a safety surface. Allotments, with fifty four plots, can be found on Temple Lane and are run by Copmanthorpe Parish Council.

The Royal Oak is the village's remaining public house. Census returns show that the Inn was, at one time, also a blacksmith's shop and a brewhouse. It was first listed as a pub in 1830.

There are numerous village functions throughout the year, including the Carnival in summer and the Fayre in spring. The local branch of the Women's Institute was formed in 1924 and moved into a purpose built hall in 1928. Other clubs and societies include a Mothers' Union, drama group, youth club and both Scouts and Girl Guide troops.

In 2014 the first charity beer festival, 'Coptoberfest', was held at St Giles Church in Copmanthorpe. In 2023 Coptoberfest raised over £7,000. To date, the event has raised over £25,000 which has been given away to local charities, good causes and organisations such as Scouts, Guides and sports clubs.

1st Copmanthorpe Scouts was formed in 1968. As of 2023, the Scouts have groups of Beavers, Cubs, Scouts and Explorers.

== Transport ==
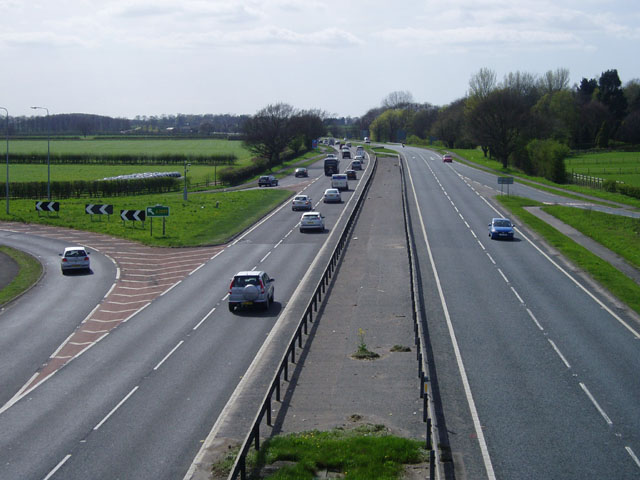
A64 near Copmanthorpe taken from grade separated junction with A1237 York Outer Ring Road.

The village is bypassed by the A64 Leeds to Scarborough road. This road used to pass through the village along the route of the old Roman road along Hallcroft Lane and Top Lane. The bypass was built in 1975–1976, with the grade separated junction linking Manor Heath to Askham Fields Lane and the A1237 York Outer Ring Road being built in 1987. The traffic lights at the end of Top Lane that used to provide access to the bypass for village residents were removed in 2002.

There was a railway station in the village that opened in 1839 on the York & North Midland line. The station was closed to passengers in 1959 and closed altogether in 1964. Plans have been put forward to reopen the station along with others in the area surrounding York, but these have failed to materialise.

The village is served by one regular local bus service from York, run by Connexions, Yorkshire Coastliner service, and by a service run by Harrogate Coach Travel as part of the York to Colton route.

== Education ==
The original village school opened in 1869 on the site now occupied by the health centre. The current junior school, opened in 1968, was designed to take over from the Victorian building, but as the population grew an infants school was also built alongside in 1972.

Primary education is currently catered for at Copmanthorpe Primary School with students usually going to Tadcaster Grammar School, a co-educational comprehensive school, for their secondary and further education.

== Religion ==
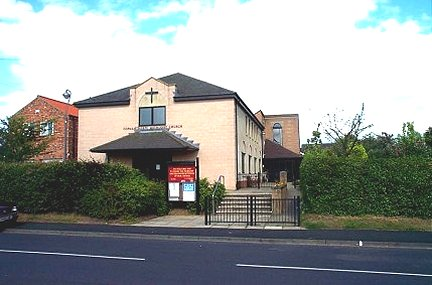
Copmanthorpe Methodist Church on Main Street.

The Grade II listed St Giles' Church on Church Street was built in 1180 and much remains of the original Norman design. St Giles did not become a parish church in its own right until 1866, as Copmanthorpe was previously part of the parish of St Mary Bishophill Junior in York. The parish was detached from St Mary Bishophill in 1844 and for a time linked to the parish at Askham Richard.

Church Street was also the site of the first Methodist Chapel in the village, around 1788. The modern chapel was built in 1958 in Main Street by the architects Greenwood and Nicholls.

== Sports ==
There is a dedicated sports area at the Recreation Ground which is the home of Copmanthorpe Football Club and Copmanthorpe Cricket Club. Copmanthorpe Tennis Club and Copmanthorpe Bowling Club are also based here.

The football club was founded in 1962 and, as of 2025, the 1st XI play in the York Minster Engineering Football League Division Two, managed by Steve Barnes. and the reserves in the Reserve C Division, managed by Steve Purdy. The club also has a Senior Disability (Pan-Disability) team, Veteran's team and representation at Junior 11 aside, 9 aside, 7 aside and 5 aside.

The cricket club, which has attained ECB Clubmark status, has around 90 members across all age groups, with a growing All-Stars Cricket and junior programme.

As of 2026, the club's 1st XI play in Division 2 of the Yorkshire Premier League North, Galtres, and the 2nd XI play in Division 4 of the same league.

Copmanthorpe Tennis Club is registered with the Lawn Tennis Association (LTA).

== See also ==
- Listed buildings in Copmanthorpe
