= Gideon Delaune =

French apothecary

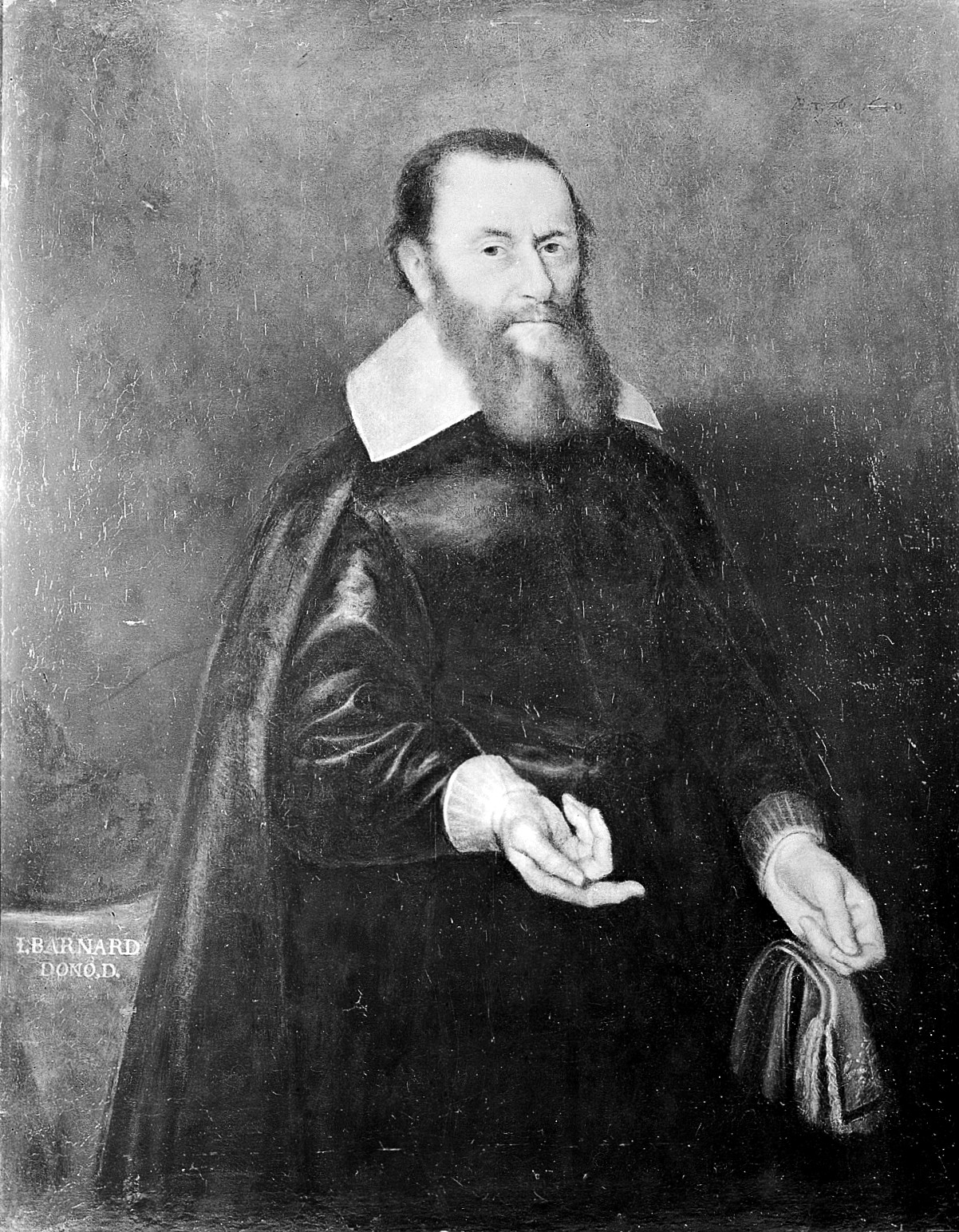
- Born: 1565? Rheims
- Died: 1659
- Occupation: Apothecary

Gideon Delaune (1565?–1659) was a French Huguenot apothecary.

== Biography ==
Delaune was the eldest son of William Delaune, a French Protestant pastor. He was born at Rheims in or about 1565. He accompanied his father to England, and was appointed apothecary to Anne of Denmark, queen of James I. When that monarch determined in 1617 to incorporate the Society of Apothecaries, 114 apothecaries, being his majesty's ‘natural subjects,’ were nominated as members. With them a few foreigners were associated, and Delaune became a member of the court of assistants. He served the office of junior warden in 1624, that of senior warden in 1627, and was master in 1637. He was appointed an alderman of Dowgate Ward 17 January 1625–6, and was discharged as an alien a week later. Thomas Delaune (Present State of London, ed. 1681, p. 329), in an account of the Apothecaries' Company, says: ‘Among many worthy members [was] Dr. Gideon de Laune, apothecary to King James, a man noted for many singularities in his time, a great benefactor to the public, and particularly to the foundation of the Apothecaries' Hall in Black-Fryars, where his statue in white marble is to be seen to this day, and to whom I have the honour to be nearly related, which is not the reason that I mention him, but to perpetuate his memory as well as others, as is due to his desert. He lived piously to the age of ninety-seven years, and worth (notwithstanding his many acts of publick and private charity) near as many thousand pounds as he was years, having thirty-seven children by one wife, and about sixty grandchildren at his funeral. His famous pill is in great request to this day, notwithstanding the swarms of pretenders to pill-making.’ This account is in some respects erroneous. He had only seventeen children, most of whom were stillborn or died in infancy, and his grandchildren were fewer than thirty in number. These facts are proved by his will, dated 19 June 1654, and proved 20 June 1659, and by his funeral certificate in the College of Arms, both of which documents give his age as ninety-four at the time of his death.

He was a great benefactor to the Apothecaries' Company, having been ‘a principal means for the procuring of the said company to be made a corporation,’ and for the purchase of Apothecaries' Hall, where a massive marble bust of him is preserved. For many years this bust occupied such a position as to be virtually excluded from sight; but in 1846 it was placed on a bracket at the upper end of the hall. There is also in the hall a portrait of him in oil, supposed to have been painted by Cornelius Johnson. He possessed an estate at Roxton, Bedfordshire, the manor of Sharsted, Kent, where some of his descendants still resided as of the 19th century, a mansion in Blackfriars, London, and extensive property in Virginia and the Bermudas.

Gideon Delaune, Robert Johnstone, and the Lombard Street goldsmith William Terry were executors of the goldsmith George Heriot, who made a bequest to found a school in Edinburgh now known as George Heriot's School.

By his wife, Judith Chamberlaine, he had a son Abraham, who married Anne, daughter of Sir Richard Sandys of Northbourne Court, Kent; and a daughter, Anne, married to Sir Richard Sprignell, bart., of Coppenthorpe, Yorkshire.
