= Clinical officer =

Gazetted officer and mid-level health care provider

Clinical officer (CO)
- is used for evaluation of patient's general condition by using the acronmy of OLD CAR: O: Onset of the disease L: Location of the pain D: Duration of the pain C: Character of the disease A: Associated, Alleviating factors R: Risk factor of the disease.

Occupation
- Names: Clinical Officer (CO) – Kenya, Malawi, Uganda, Rwanda, South Sudan and somalia; Assistant Medical Officer (AMO) – Tanzania and Malaysia; Medical Licentiate (ML) – Zambia; Physician Assistant (PA) – Liberia, Ghana, India, Netherland, Germany, Australia, Canada and The United States (US); Physician Associate (PA) – The United Kingdom (UK) and The United States (US); Integrated Emergency Surgical Officer (IESO) – Ethiopia; Clinical Health Officer (CHO) – Somaliland; Clinical Associate (CA) – South Africa; Community Health Officer (CHO) – Sierra Leone and Nigeria; Medical Extension Officer (MEDEX) – Guyana; Medical Assistant (MA) – Fiji; Sub-Assistant Community Medical Officer (SACMO) – Bangladesh; Assistant Doctor (AD) – China and Botswana
- Occupation type: Healthcare professional
- Activity sectors: Primary care; Infection prevention and control; Triage; Patient safety; Emergency medicine; Public safety; Forensic medicine; Medical ethics; human rights; Reproductive health; Mental disorders; Patient advocacy; Pharmacovigilance; Disease surveillance; Community diagnosis; Contact tracing; Immunization; Palliative care; Clinical nutrition; Food safety; Pain management; Clinical supervision; Health Service Management; Sanitation; Internal medicine; Family medicine; Geriatrics; Paediatrics; Neonatology; Obstetrics; Gynaecology; Surgery; Orthopaedics; Traumatology; Oncology; Critical care medicine; Gastroenterology; Toxicology; Nephrology; Anaesthesiology; Otolaryngology; Ophthalmology; Dentistry; Neurology; Radiology; Psychiatry; Dermatology; Venereology; Respiratory medicine; Cardiovascular medicine; Haematology; Transfusion medicine; Tropical medicine; Community health; Environmental health; Rural health; Epidemiology; Occupational medicine; Clinical pharmacology; Therapeutics; Human anatomy; Medical physiology; Medical biochemistry; Molecular biology; Cellular biology; Medical genetics; Pathology; Medical microbiology; Medical parasitology; Sub-specialties; Health Systems Management; Quality assurance and Quality control; Health technology; Health economics; Global health; Disaster management; International health

Description
- Competencies: Venipuncture; Medical history taking; Physical examination; Point-of-care testing; Medical diagnosis; Laboratory investigations; Radiological investigations; Medical ultrasound; Medical prescription; Medical procedures; Medical photography; Rehabilitation; Preventive healthcare; Health information management; Medical classification; Medical education; Health promotion; Health advocacy
- Education required: Diploma in Clinical Medicine and Surgery (3 years) + internship (1 year) + Clinical supervision (3 years), total 7 years or 331 weeks or 13240 hours; BSc. Clinical Medicine and Surgery (4 years) + internship (1 year) + Clinical supervision (3 years), total 8 years or 376 weeks or 15040 hours; Higher Diploma in Clinical Medicine and Surgery (18 months or 68 weeks or 2700 hours); MSc. Clinical Medicine and Surgery (2 years or 90 weeks or 3600 hours); PhD. Clinical Medicine and Surgery (4 years or 180 weeks or 7200 hours)
- Fields of employment: Public service; Government agencies; Kenya Defense Forces; Nonprofit organizations; Humanitarian organizations; Health Management Organisations; Universities/Colleges; Hospitals; Clinics; Private practice; Teaching; Clinical research
- Related jobs: Assistant Physician in the US; Nurse practitioner (US and Canada); Anesthesiologist assistant (US); Pathologists' assistant (US and Canada); Dental hygienist (US)

A clinical officer (CO) is a licensed practitioner of medicine in East Africa and parts of Southern Africa who is trained and authorized to perform general or specialized medical duties such as diagnosis and treatment of disease and injury, ordering and interpreting medical tests, performing routine medical and surgical procedures, and referring patients to other practitioners.

Unlike nurses and physician assistants, a clinical officer is an independent practitioner who is trained in the medical model to practice the full scope of medicine and provides routine care in general medicine or within a medical specialty such as anesthesia and carries out treatment that is outside the nurses' scope. A clinical officer usually oversees a health center or a district hospital and is part of the medical team in bigger hospitals where one may head a department or work under a senior clinical officer or a physician.

== History ==
In her books, "Beyond the State: The Colonial Medical Service in British Africa" and "Indian Doctors in Kenya, 1895 - 1940: The Forgotten History", the author Anna Greenwood notes that before 1923 there were twice as many Indian doctors as there were European doctors working in the Colonial Medical Service. The Indian doctors had migrated to British Africa along with the coolies who came to work on the Uganda Railway. The Indian doctors faced discrimination and were not appointed to nor paid at the same rank as medical officers (European doctors). Instead, they were designated as Assistant or Sub-assistant surgeons despite having attended similar 3 - 4 year Indian medical schools that were recognized by the General Medical Council in the UK and performing clinical and administrative duties that were largely identical to those of the European doctors. From the mid-1920s the Indians were removed from the colonial service as they were not deemed to be the proper face of the imperial services in Africa. The Indian Assistant and Sub-Assistant Surgeons were thus replaced with similarly qualified Africans who came to be known as clinical officers when the authorizing legislation was passed in 1988 abolishing the Assistant and Sub-Assistant Surgeon and similar positions.

== Overview ==
To practice medicine and surgery or dentistry as a clinical officer one requires at least four years of full-time medical training, supervised clinical practice and internship at an accredited medical training institution and hospitals and registration with the relevant medical board in their country. After a prescribed number of years in active practice, one may complete a further one or two-year residency programme in order to specialize in any approved branch of clinical medicine and surgery such as anesthesia or pediatrics, or get an advanced medical qualification from the university. There are no pathways (post-basic or post-graduate entry-level conversion programs) for nurses and other health workers hence it takes at least eight years of specialised medical training and experience for a clinical officer to graduate with a post-basic qualification. "Clinical officer" in some countries such as Tanzania and Zambia refers to a different cadre of health workers, comparable to "medical assistants" in Malawi, who have less than three years of training but who may upgrade to a similar level by becoming Assistant Medical Officers (AMOs) or Medical Licentiates (MLs)."medical assistants/Sub Assistant Community Medical Officer" in Bangladesh, a Four Year medical diploma course conducting state medical faculty of Bangladesh under ministry of Health and family welfare.

A clinician can specialize in any other field that is deemed appropriate by them and not just clinical medicine. China also has masters of clinical medicine. In countries like Tanzania, UK, and other countries, clinical medicine is regarded as a medical course and graduates are allowed to apply to masters of medicine specialties.

No significant difference has been demonstrated in studies comparing treatment decisions, patient outcomes, quality of care provided and level of knowledge about diseases between a clinical officer and a medical officer (a non-specialist physician) except in countries where nurses were mistakenly assessed as clinical officers. However, because of the nature of practice, populations served and resources at ones disposal, a clinical officer is less likely to administer expensive treatment, prescribe expensive (but not necessarily better) drugs or engage in futile care.

The success of HIV/AIDS prevention and treatment initiatives in Africa is mostly attributed to use of clinical officers to diagnose the disease and provide comprehensive medical care. Access to emergency obstetric care through greater deployment of the clinical officer is one way of attaining the Millennium Development Goals 4 (reducing child mortality) and 5 (improving maternal health).

Worldwide, patients are seen by many other practitioners other than the traditional doctor such as:

- Osteopathic physicians, Podiatrists, Optometrists and Anesthesiologist assistants in the United States
- Emergency and Clinical Officer Pakistan
- Physician Assistants in the United States, United Kingdom, Netherlands, Liberia and Ghana
- Assistant Doctors in China,
- Surgical Care and Emergency Care Practitioners in the UK,
- Assistant Physicians in Saudi Arabia,
- Health Extension Officers in Papua New Guinea
- medical assistants/Sub Assistant Community Medical Officer in Bangladesh
- Medical Assistants in Fiji
- Assistant Medical Officers in Malaysia
- Surgical Technologists in Mozambique
- Clinical Associates in South Africa.

=== Scope of practice ===
A clinical officer takes the Hippocratic oath and, depending on jurisdiction, may be registered by the same statutory board as physicians (in the southern countries such as Zambia and Malawi) or a separate board (in the eastern countries such as Kenya and Uganda). The broad nature of medical training prepares one to work at all levels of the health care system. Most work in primary care health centres and clinics, and casualty departments in hospitals where one will diagnose and treat all common diseases, including serious and life-threatening ones, in all age groups; and stabilise then admit, discharge or refer emergency cases. In smaller hospitals one may work as a hospitalist and one who has specialized in a clinical field provides advanced medical and surgical care and treatment such as administering anesthesia, performing general or specialised surgery, supervising other health workers and other administrative duties.

A clinical officer's scope of practice depends on one's training and experience, jurisdiction and workplace policies. In Malawi, for instance, a clinical officer performs all routine surgical and obstetric operations such as exploratory laparotomy, emergency orthopaedics and Caesarean section. However, in Kenya, Tanzania and Mozambique one has to undergo further specialized training in order to perform such major operations safely.

In rural and small urban health facilities a clinical officer is usually the highest medical care provider and works with minimal resources, relying on the traditional medical history and physical examination, often with little or no laboratory facilities, to make a diagnosis and provide treatment. In bigger and better equipped facilities a clinical officer generally acquires superior knowledge, experience and skills and provides high quality and a wider range of services in district, provincial and national hospitals, universities and colleges, research institutions and private medical facilities.

A clinical officer is usually the lowest entry-level cadre in the medical hierarchy but with years of experience and/or further training one can rise to the same or a higher grade than a physician. In most countries, however, wages are usually low compared to training and responsibilities and career progression is usually restricted by awarding terminal degrees and diplomas, training students who have not attained the minimum university entry grade and, in some countries, not awarding any degree or recognition for advanced training. In such countries, this usually results in a demotivated and low quality workforce and resulting poor health indicators.

The United States' Centers for Disease Control and Prevention and other international health and research institutions make extensive use of COs in their projects in Africa and clinical officers have been the backbone of HIV care and treatment enabling the rollout of ARVS to even the most rural hard to reach areas in Africa.

Research done by the University of Birmingham and published in the British Medical Journal concluded that the effectiveness and safety of caeserian sections carried out by clinical officers did not differ significantly compared with doctors. Better health outcomes including lower maternal mortality rates were observed where COs had completed further specialised training particularly in anaesthesia.

In the multi-country study, poor outcomes were observed in Burkina Faso and Zaire - the only countries where the procedure was performed by trained nurses. Higher rates of wound infection and Wound dehiscence in these countries was thought to be due to the nurses' poor surgical technique and need for enhanced training. ≠

== Kenya ==
Kenya has a comprehensive framework of parallel laws and regulations that govern the medical practice of medical officers and clinical officers. The supreme health policy and medical authorities in the republic are the cabinet secretary of health and the director of medical services who oversee the registration and licensing of medical institutions and the training, registration and licensing of medical practitioners through the Medical Practitioners and Dentists Board and the Clinical Officers Council.

As a British colony in 1928, Kenya started training a select group of natives to practice medicine and care for the local population who were increasingly accepting and seeking western medicine. After independence from Britain in 1963, medical training in Kenya initially adopted the four-year medical school system used in the US rather than the six-year UK model. This was heavily influenced by the Kennedy Airlift which followed initial funding by the African-American Students Foundation (AASF) in 1959 and led to hundreds of young Kenyan students getting scholarships to study in American institutions: These students came back to Kenya after their studies and joined the civil service in the early post-independence Kenya. It was also around this time that the first DOs were accepted as medical officers by the US civil service and by 1967 the structure and duration of medical training in Kenya was similar to the US MD training. When the University of Nairobi split from the University of East Africa and became the first university in Kenya in 1970, it continued to teach the six-year British degree which led to the creation of two statutory bodies: the Kenya Medical Practitioners and Dentists Board in 1978 which had jurisdiction over medical officers and physicians, and the Clinical Officers Council in 1989 which had jurisdiction over clinical officers. Instead of residency for the clinical officer, the higher diploma in paediatrics, ophthalmology and other specializations was introduced in the late 1970s as a post-basic course for those who had worked for three or more years and, after ten years of service, one became a Senior Clinical Officer and qualified for a licence to practice under his own name as a private medical practitioner. The BSc. Clinical Medicine and Surgery degree was later introduced in 2006.

Clinical officers play a central role in Kenya's medical sector today. There were 8,600 clinical officers on the register in 2010 compared to 7,100 medical officers. They are trained by the universities, the Kenya Medical Training College (KMTC), St. Mary's School of Clinical Medicine and other private institutions. The Ministry of Health, through the Clinical Officers Council (COC) regulates their training and practice, accredits training institutions, and approves the syllabi of the universities and colleges. The Kenya Medical Training College (KMTC), also under the Ministry of Health, has campuses in regional teaching hospitals and trains the majority of clinical officers. St. Mary's School of Clinical Medicine and St. Mary's Mission Hospital in Mumias, owned by the Roman Catholic diocese of Kakamega, was the first private institution to train clinical officers. It admits students who got the minimum university entry grade in high school and have passed a written examination and oral interview. The students sit the same examination as their counterparts at the KMTC and are examined by consultants from the public service.

The dual diploma in clinical medicine and surgery plus an internship year is the standard qualification for clinical officers which is awarded on completion of a four-year training programme which started as various programmes that were used to train medical practitioners in the East Africa Protectorate in the 1920s and which now resembles the North American four-year MD and DO medical school programmes (including being structured in 9 trimesters over 3 years to meet the minimum 130 weeks of instruction recommended by the Liaison Committee on Medical Education) instead of the more recent six-year MBChB programme that was introduced in the 1970s and is more common in European and Commonwealth countries:

Medical Officers training:

- Is a six-year professional degree programme accredited by the Medical Practitioners and Dentists Board involving
- Two years of pre-clinical training in medical sciences followed by
- Four years of training in clinical medicine, surgery and community health including a mandatory one-year internship and
- Registration, licensing and gazettment by the Medical Practitioners and Dentists Board giving
- Unlimited practice rights with
- Specialisation and private practice allowed and eligible for full professional membership of the Kenya Medical Association (KMA)

Clinical Officers training:

- Is a four or five-year professional diploma or degree programme accredited by the Clinical Officers Council involving
- One year of pre-clinical training in medical sciences followed by
- Three or four years of training in clinical medicine, surgery and community health including a mandatory one-year internship and
- Registration, licensing and gazettment by the Clinical Officers Council giving
- Unlimited practice rights with
- Specialisation and private practice allowed and eligible for full professional membership of the Kenya Clinical Officers Association (KCOA)

The current training follows international guidelines and the two qualifications are awarded jointly on successful completion of a comprehensive nine trimester programme of full-time study, practicals and examinations which are covered over three years leading to a fourth mandatory year of internship in a teaching hospital. A fifth and sixth residency specialisation years are undertaken after registration by the Clinical Officers Council and three years of work experience in general medicine which leads to the award of a general degree in clinical medicine or a specialist diploma in pediatrics, orthopedics, psychiatry, anaesthesia, reproductive health and other specialties.

A clinical officer is therefore able to graduate and join the workforce in a minimum of four calendar years and provides medical services within the full scope of family and emergency medicine or within a narrower scope depending on their area of specialisation.

Registration by the Clinical Officers Council (COC) entitles one to render medical services in any public or private medical institution or to practice medicine independently as a private practitioner. Registration also qualifies one to join and participate in the affairs of the Kenya Clinical Officers Association (KCOA), including its annual KCOA Scientific Conference, and the Kenya Union of Clinical Officers (KUCO). As per the government's Revised Scheme of Service for Clinical Personnel (2014) a clinical officer works at any of 8 grades depending on ones seniority.

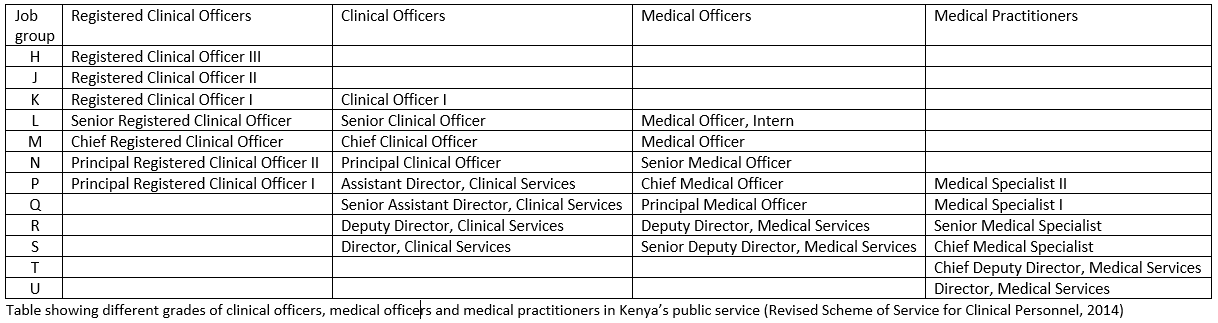
Table showing different grades of clinical officers, medical officers and medical practitioners in Kenya's public service

As gazetted officers all registered clinical officers are legally authorized to prepare, sign, issue and keep safe custody of official state documents such as medical examination reports, sick notes, postmortem examination reports and death certificates and to appear in courts of law as expert witnesses. For this reason, a clinical officer is the officer in-charge of a health center or a district hospital and is part of the medical team in bigger hospitals where one may head a department or work under a senior clinical officer or a physician.

Clinical officers are direct healthcare providers who manage and administer health institutions, medical schemes and projects in primary healthcare (PHC) settings and are frontline stakeholders in Universal Health Coverage in Kenya which is one of the key pillars of the government's 5-year development plan under President Uhuru Kenyatta. The four pillars of the 5-year development plan are 1. Manufacturing 2. Affordable housing 3. Universal Health Coverage and 4. Food security.

=== Legal status ===
In Kenya's public health system, a clinical officer is an alternative practitioner who is trained and authorized by law to perform any technical, administrative or legal duties that require a medical doctor. However, due to the shorter training period when compared to medical officers (i.e. 4 years instead of 6 years), a clinical officer joins the public service at a lower grade and gains seniority through experience, additional training or further education.

Like the term medical officer, the term clinical officer is a protected title whose use without the authority of the Clinical Officers Council is prohibited and a punishable offense under Kenyan laws. Court rulings uphold that a registration certificate or a licence issued by the council automatically confers the status of a medical officer or a qualified medical practitioner to a clinician and the titles are used interchangeably in medico-legal documents because a qualified clinical officer has a recognized medical qualification and is eligible for registration as a medical practitioner under Section 11(1) of the Medical Practitioners and Dentists Act in addition to being expressly authorized to practice medicine, surgery or dentistry by Section 7(4) of the Clinical Officers ActCriminal Appeal 198 of 2008 - Kenya Law Criminal Case 6 of 2004 - Kenya Law CAP. 249

From the Anatomy Act, the legal definition of a medical officer is any public officer who is entitled to be registered as a medical practitioner if he applied under any law in the country: Section 14(1) of the Medical Practitioners and Dentists Act and Section 7(4) of the Clinical Officers Act are the only two laws that can authorize one to practice medicine and render medical or dental services in the public sector if they hold a registration certificate or in the private sector if they hold a current licence as well. The Public Health Act further defines a medical officer of health as a public officer who is responsible for health nationally (the Director of Medical Services and the Director clinical services) or regionally (the county or sub-county Medical Officer of Health and the county or sub-county Clinical Officer).

Like his counterparts in the public service, a clinical officer in the private sector has the same practice rights and privileges as a medical officer and both are authorized to work independently and specialize in any approved branch of general or specialised medicine. The Competition Act No.12 of 2010 directly prohibits and addresses multi-sectoral abuse of dominance, consumer welfare, exemptions, cartels and unwarranted concentration of economic power among practitioners.

A register of active clinical officers and medical institutions is available online on the Clinical Officers Council and Ministry of Health websites.

=== The Clinical Officers (Training, Registration and Licensing) Act No. 20 of 2017 ===
The Clinical Officers (Training, Registration and Licensing) Act No.20 of 2017 is the law that governs the medical practice of a clinical Officer. It establishes the Clinical Officers Council whose functions are to:

- advise the government on policy matters relating to clinical medicine practice
- prescribe the minimum educational entry requirements for persons wishing to be trained as clinical officers
- approve institutions other than those established or accredited under the Universities Act, 2012 for the training of clinical officers
- establish, approve and accredit programs for continuing professional educational programs
- register and license clinical officers for the purposes of this Act
- maintain a register and records of all clinical officers registered under this Act
- cause to be published in the Kenya Gazette every calendar year the names of all registered clinical officers
- promote development and adoption of codes of practice
- regulate the professional conduct and ensure the maintenance and improvement of the standards of practice of clinical medicine
- collaborate with other medical professional associations, organisations and other relevant bodies, in the furtherance of the functions of the council and those bodies
- consider and deal with any other matter pertaining to clinical officers including prescribing badges, insignias or uniforms to be worn by clinical officers and
- carry out other functions related to the implementation of this Act.

=== Training ===
Although training programmes existed as early as 1928, the first university to train clinical officers was Egerton University in 1999. Programs also exist at Masinde Muliro University of Science and Technology (MMUST), Uzima University, Jomo Kenyatta University of Agriculture and Technology, Kenya Methodist University (KEMU) Mt Kenya University. and Presbyterian university of East Africa (PUEA)., and Meru University of Science and Technology (MUST). The diploma in Clinical Medicine and Surgery is completed in nine 15-week trimesters over three calendar years (or 135 weeks which, notably, exceeds the minimum 130 weeks of instruction required to complete US MD programs). The BSc. Clinical Medicine and Surgery is completed over 4 years.

Students study the biomedical and clinical sciences such as anatomy, physiology and pathology in the first year followed by the clinical subjects (medicine, surgery, pediatrics, obstetrics and gynecology) in the second year. The third and fourth year involves supervised clinical practice and internship in teaching hospitals where they rotate in all the departments, receive beside lectures, attend consultants' ward rounds, clerk patients and present medical histories, perform deliveries and first-assist in major surgery. They also attend clinical meetings and write prescriptions which at this stage must be counter-signed by a supervising clinician.

There is special emphasis on primary care with modules on community health taught throughout the course. Before starting their internship after the third year, clinical officers spend at least one month in a Provincial Rural Health Training Centre where they immunize children, examine pregnant women and offer family planning services in mother and child health clinics. They also treat in-patients and out-patients under the guidance of qualified Clinical officers and organise outreach services where they venture into remote rural villages, seeing patients and immunising children. During this time they complete a project in community diagnosis.

They also learn Health Service Management which prepares them for their management and leadership roles in health centers and other institutions.

=== Internship and registration ===
All clinical officers must work as full-time interns for one year without pay or any form of motivation at an approved public or mission hospital before getting a licence to practice medicine, a situation that has resulted to major strikes by clinical officers in the past leading to operation standstills in public hospitals when these strikes occur. On passing the final qualifying examination, they take the hippocratic oath then apply for provisional registration by the Clinical Officers Council, the statutory body that regulates the practice of clinical officers in the country. The internship involves supervised rotations in the major clinical departments namely casualty, medicine, paediatrics, surgery, obstetrics and gynecology. They are supervised by consultants in the respective fields. The consultants ensure that they can practice clinical medicine safely before signing them off for registration. An internship booklet signed by the consultants is required for registration. After registration one is required to apply for a licence from the COC which allows them to practice medicine, surgery and dentistry legally in the country. This licence is renewable every two years. Renewal requires evidence of having attained 60 Continuous Professional Development (CPD) points in the CPD diary by further training, research and publications, attending conferences and Continuing Medical Education (CME) sessions or major ward rounds and outreach activities.

=== Careers Progression ===
An experienced clinical officer usually holds a senior clinical, administrative or teaching position within their organisation or establishes and manages his/her own private practice. One who holds the Diploma in Clinical Medicine and Surgery can upgrade his/her qualification to the BSc. Clinical Medicine and Surgery or undertake postgraduate training at the university. One may also enroll for the Higher Diploma programme at the Kenya Medical Training College.

The Higher Diploma in Clinical Medicine and Surgery requires at least three years of working experience and lasts twelve to eighteen months leading to a specialised qualification and re-designation as a specialised clinical officer in one of the medical specialties such as paediatrics, reproductive health, anaesthesia, ENT, ophthalmology and cataract surgery, orthopaedics, psychiatry/clinical psychology, skin and chest diseases, epidemiology, pathology and Community medicine. A specialised clinical officer provides advanced medical and surgical care including invasive procedures in their specialty such as caeserian section, cataract surgery, tonsillectomy, psychotherapy and administration of anaesthesia.

== Malawi ==
Medical care is generally provided by clinical officers who are even capable of providing surgical care. Clinical Officers are trained for 4 years, (3+1 year of clinical internship at designated teaching hospitals). One meta-analysis documented that the provision of caesarean section by clinical officers does not result in a significant increase in maternal or perinatal mortality. In other, words there was no difference whether the operation was done by clinical officers or medical doctor

== Sudan ==
Southern Sudan separated from the Arab North (Sudan) in July 2011 after years of civil war that left much of the southern part in ruins. The healthcare system is almost non-existent. AMREF started training clinical officers by setting up the Maridi National Health Training Institute, name="AMREF"/>

The graduates supplement the efforts of COs trained in neighboring countries, e.g. Kenya, Uganda and Tanzania, most of whom work for international humanitarian agencies. Since 2014, Juba institute of Health Sciences and Ayii University 2021 have now joined in production of competent cadres in the Health in the Republic of South Sudan.

== Tanzania ==
In Tanzania, training is under the Ministry of Health. There are numerous clinical officer training schools and programs last three years. Internship is not required for registration.

Experienced clinical officers may enrol for an advanced diploma in clinical medicine which takes two years to complete. This qualification is regarded as equivalent to a first degree in medicine by universities and the Ministry of Health in the country. The graduates are known as Assistant Medical Officers which no longer exist since 2017 so a clinical officer can upgrade by studying a bachelor's degree in clinical medicine in any East African country for three years or study it in Tanzania for four years and graduate as a doctor equivalent to an MD graduate even in salary and job opportunities or can study the Medical Doctor(MD) which is a 5-year course plus 1 internship year making 6 years and can add 1 year to be Medical bachelor and Bachelor in Surgery (MBBS) if interested.

A further two years training from the Clinical Officer level leads to a specialist qualification in anaesthesia, medicine, surgery and radiology etc.

Kampala International University has opened a campus in Dar es Salaam where it is now offering its Bachelor of Clinical Medicine and Community Health.

== Uganda ==
By 1918, Uganda was training clinical officers who were called medical assistants at the time. The training is under the Ministry of Education and takes place in clinical officer training schools. Postsecondary programs last three years, focusing on medicine and hospice care, followed by a two-year internship.

Kampala International University offers a Bachelor of Clinical Medicine and Community Health. High school graduates take four-and-a-half years to complete this degree while practicing clinical officers take three years.

== Zambia ==
In Zambia, clinical officers who complete a three-year diploma of Science in Clinical Medicine course are called CLINICAL OFFICER -GENERAL (COG). Those who complete a three-year diploma in clinical psychiatry are called CLINICAL OFFICER -PSYCHIATRY (COP). Currently the upgrade of this diploma is a Bachelor of Science and holders are called medical licentiates. Medical licentiates have advanced skills in medicine and surgery and may be deployed interchangeably with physicians. Medical licentiates outnumber general physicians (with university degree) across all regions, with the ratio ranging from 3.8 COs per physician in Lusaka to 19.3 in the Northwestern provinces. They perform routine surgical and obstetric operations as well as providing clinical care in hospitals. The College of Surgeons of East, Central and Southern Africa (COSECSA) is involved in their training to increase their surgical skills through the Clinical Officers Surgical Training (COST) programme.

== Burkina Faso ==
In Burkina Faso, as elsewhere in sub-Saharan Africa, the use of non-physician clinicians began as a temporary measure while more doctors were trained, but has become a permanent strategy in the face of a crisis in health human resources. Different training alternatives have been used. Two-year advanced training programs in surgery were developed for registered nurses. Clinical officers (known as attachés de santé en chirurgie) were district medical officers trained with an additional six-month curriculum in emergency surgery.

Many studies show that trained COs provide quality medical and surgical care with outcomes similar to physicians' providing similar care in the same setting. However, nurses re-trained to become COs have been associated with more adverse outcomes as shown in a study using 2004-2005 hospital data from six regions of Burkina Faso, which associated them with higher maternal and neonatal mortality when they performed caesarian sections. The observed higher fatality rate pointed to a need for refresher courses and closer supervision of the nurses.

== Ethiopia ==
The first medical school in Ethiopia was initially a "health officer" training institution. The training of health officers started at Gonder University in 1954. Health officers training programs across Ethiopia require that students have some of the highest scores in National University Entrance Examination to be admitted. Health officers hold bachelor's degrees and undergo a three-year training program plus one-year internship. Those who complete a 2–3 years master's degree programs provide advanced care (e.g. emergency surgery).

== Ghana ==
In Ghana, Medical Assistants (MAs) have traditionally been experienced nurses who have undergone an 18-month post-basic course to become MAs. High school graduates can now attend a three-year diploma course to become MAs. In Ghana, from 2012, the nomenclature Medical Assistant had been changed to Physician Assistant.. The new name Physician Assistant is not known among most Ghanaians The term Physician Assistant (PA) refers to three distinct groups of health professionals trained on the medical model to practise medicine and dentistry. They are the PA-Medical, PA-Dental and also known as Community Oral Health Officers and PA-Anaesthesia (also known as Nurse Anesthetists). These groups of mid-level health providers were trained exclusively in the past by Health Training Institutions (HTIs) under the Ministry of Health with the aim of extending care to the populace where physician numbers were scanty or not present. Currently, there are eight universities in Ghana offering a 4-year Bachelor of Science degree in Physician Assistantship. The objective of the Bachelor of Physician Assistantship programme is to train graduates who will possess the ability to evaluate the health status of an individual, diagnose and treat acute illness as well as life saving interventions, manage chronic diseases, deliver preventive care and counsel individuals on psychosocial problems in independently or in collaboration with a physician.

In 2016, the PA-Anaesthesia group broke away and became certified registered anaesthetist (CRA) according to the Health Professions Regulatory Acts 857 which addressed them as certified registered anaesthetist. PAs are qualified by graduation from the PA educational programme and certification by the Ghana Medical and Dental Council. Newly qualified PAs who are successful in their licentiate examinations by the MDC are issued with provisional registrations to enable them undertake one-year internship in an accredited institution, a prerequisite for permanent registration which would also serve as national service but without pay for the twelve months.

PA students in all PA training schools belong to the Physician Assistant Association of Ghana (PASAG). In order to foster unity, camaraderie and bond among members of the association, and to promote excellence in the discharge of their professional mandate, quiz competitions are held every year. The maiden edition was won by the Presbyterian University College, Ghana. After permanent certification, among other things, PAs diagnose and treat illnesses, conduct physical examinations, counsel individuals on preventative health issues, and order and interpret laboratory tests. In addition, PAs are first or second assistants in major surgery, and provide pre- and post-operative care, and for that matter are trained and well versed in surgical skills. Thus, PAs play roles in preventive Medicine, as well as in educational, research, and administrative activities. The physician assistant is part of the medical team and is placed above the nurse but below the medical officer They perform tasks originally performed by doctors. Some call PAs as "village doctors" or "chiefs." To the patient, a PA is a doctor, since the PA practises medicine just as a doctor

The Ghana Physician Assistant Association-Medical at their last annual delegate congress, voted for a name change from the current name Physician Assistant to Clinical Officer. The members of the association believes that the Assistant attached to their name is limitation to what the PA actually does. The PA is not an assistant but an independent medical professional trained and licensed to practise medicine and dentistry. The association has therefore presented a new job description and the new name clinical officer to the Ministry of Health. The meeting which was chaired by the chief director of the ministry of health Dr. Afisah Zakariah who promised to address the grievances of the PAs soon to be known as Clinical Officers

The Ghana Academy of Clinical Officers (GACO), established in 2025 following its rebranding from the Graduate Physician Associates of Ghana (GRAPAG), is a professional organization representing Certified Registered Clinical Officers, also known as Clinical Doctors, in Ghana. Only members of GACO use the prefix Clin.Dr before their names. The professional association is the Ghana Physician Assistants Association.

GACO seeks to promote the professional development, specialization, and recognition of Clinical Officers, who play a vital role in Ghana’s healthcare delivery. The organization offers specialized training, advocates for policy support, and collaborates with regulatory agencies to uphold high standards in healthcare. It also provides a platform for continuous education, research, and networking among healthcare practitioners, especially in underserved areas.

The practice of Clinical Officers and Physician Assistants in Ghana is regulated by the Ghana Medical and Dental Council.

== Liberia ==
In Liberia, the Tubman National Institute of Medical Arts (TNIMA) was established in 1945. In 1965, the physician assistant (PA) programme was established as a joint venture between the Liberian government, WHO and UNICEF. Initially it was a one-year course, but currently it is a three-year diploma course accredited by the Liberia National Physician Assistant Association (LINPAA) and the Liberia Medical and Dental Association Board. In order to legally practice medicine as a PA one must sit and pass a state exam administered by the medical board.

== Mozambique ==
In Mozambique, tecnicos de cirurgia, or surgical technologists, are experienced Clinical Officers who undergo further residential training in surgery under the supervision of senior surgeons lasting two years at Maputo Central Hospital, and a one-year internship at a provincial hospital. They are trained to carry out emergency surgery, obstetrics and traumatology and are deployed to the district hospitals where they are usually the sole surgical care providers.

== South Africa ==
South Africa trains clinical associates for three years and awards them the Bachelor of Clinical Medical Practice degree. The first program was launched by the late Health Minister Tshabalala Msimang on 18 August 2008 at the Walter Sisulu University in Mthatha. The first class graduated in December 2010. Programs also exist at the University of Pretoria and the University of the Witwatersrand.

== International ==
The specialised nature of medical training in the developed world has created a shortage of general practitioners and runaway expenditure on healthcare by governments. primary care is increasingly being provided by non-physician providers such as physician assistants.

== United States ==
Physician assistants in the United States train for at least two years at the postsecondary level and can hold an associate, bachelors or master's degree. Most PAs have earned a master's degree. Some institutions offer a Doctor of Science degree in the same. The profession is represented by the American Academy of Physician Associates.

== United Kingdom ==
The United Kingdom has in recent years employed physician assistants from the United States on a trial basis as it plans to introduce this cadre into their health care system. Several UK universities are already offering a post-graduate diploma in Physician Assistant studies. The PAs of the UK are represented by the Association of UK PAs.

== Australia ==
The University of Queensland offers a one-and-a-half-year Master of Physician Assistant Studies to those with a bachelor's degree. Those with a post-secondary healthcare qualification such as registered nurses and paramedics can access the programme via a Graduate Certificate in Physician Assistant Studies; as long as they have at least five years full-time working experience. It has been announced that PAs will be allowed to work in Queensland as fully licensed practitioners in 2014.

== China ==
China has about 880,000 Rural Doctors and 110,000 assistant doctors who provide primary care to rural populations where they are also known as barefoot doctors. They typically have about one year of training; those who sit and pass government examinations qualify to be rural doctors. Those who fail become community health workers. However, there is a government move to have all rural doctors complete three years training.

== Fiji ==
Africa and the rest of the world are perhaps following a well trode path. In 1879, a group of Indians arrived in Fiji by ship having survived cholera and smallpox en route. During a period of crew quarantine, a small group was trained in vaccination. The experience was considered so successful that a few years later, in 1885, a group of young Fijian men started a three-year training program at the Suva Medical School, now known as the Fiji School of Medicine. The title given to the professional practice has had many names over the years, including Native Medical Practitioner, Assistant Medical Practitioner, Assistant Medical Officer, and Primary Care Practitioner (PCP). By 1987, the PCPs were training for three years before going back to their communities to serve one-year internship, followed by another two years of study after which they were awarded a MBBS degree.

== India ==
Under British rule, India trained licentiate doctors for three years. They were then registered with the General Medical Council of Britain. Most of them worked among the rural population providing medical care.

After independence, and on the recommendation of the bhore committee in 1946, the training of licentiate doctors was stopped and their qualifications converted to MBBS degrees. They were then grandfathered into the Medical Council of India.

The plan was to train enough doctors who would serve the whole country. However, the plan has not borne fruit and doctors generally leave their rural posts after their internship for more lucrative and glamorous careers in the big cities.

As of 2009, the Indian government plans to introduce a three-and-a-half-year Bachelor of Rural Medicine and Surgery (BRMS) degree to train doctors who will work in remote Indian villages. On graduation they will undergo a one-year internship period at a regional hospital before being licensed. Those with five years' experience will qualify for post-graduate studies on equal standing with their MBBS counterparts.

In India, the Madras Medical Mission in Chennai, collaborating with Birla Institute of Technology and Frontier Lifeline has since 1992 offered a Bachelor of Science degree in Physician Assistant studies. The program duration is four years, comprising three years classroom and laboratory coursework then one year compulsory internship. Several other universities offer similar courses in partnership with US universities. PAs in India can pursue masters and doctor of science degrees.

== Bangladesh ==
Mid-label Medical Care Health Human Resources of Bangladesh are Medical Assistant product of Medical Assistant Training School (MATS).3 year Medical Assistant Course Started 1976. Now 4 year Medical Assistant course 3 years academy+1 year internship See Also Sub assistant community Medical Officer

=== History ===
Bangladesh was part of British India until independence, and then spent a quarter of a century as East Pakistan before Bangladesh seceded and became an independent nation.

=== British India ===
Modern Bangladesh was mostly part of Bengal in British India.

In 1914 the State medical Faculty of Bengal was established to conduct trained Licentiate of Medical Faculty doctors (LMF Doctor) for four years Mid-Label Diploma Physician. They were then registered with the General Medical Council of Britain. Most of them worked among the rural population providing medical care. At independence East Pakistan had five medical schools:

- Mitford Medical School, Dhaka (1875-1957)
- Lytton Medical School, Mymensingh (1924-1962)
- Chittagong Medical School (1927-1957)
- Sylhet Medical School (1948-1962)
- Rajshahi Medical School (1954-1958)

=== East Pakistan ===
After independence from Britain, the training of licentiate doctors was continued in East Pakistan and the training goes for three years and they become professional doctors, with the doctor title, whose degree is equivalent to clinical medicine. and on the recommendation of the bhore committee in 1946, started MBBS Degree. They were then grandfathered into the Medical Council of India & Pakistan. In 1962 Health Minister Monem Khan introduced Condensed MBBS Course for LMF Doctor at Sir Salimullah Medical College, Dhaka from 1963 to 1972.

=== Bangladesh ===
After independence from Pakistan, the training of licentiate doctors (LMF Doctor) course was stopped. All Medical School Converted Medical College & Course Started MBBS. The First Five year plan [1973] of the Father of Nations sheik Mujibur Rahman Government planned to create new health cadre namely "Medical Assistant" & institution name "Medical Assistant Training School" (MATS). In 1976 started Medical Assistant training course under State Medical Faculty of Bangladesh & Ministry of health & family welfare. In 1980 1st Batch Medical Assistant student enter government service. In 1983 Medical Assistant get Bangladesh Medical & Dental Council Registration 1st time. In 1996 Medical Assistant Post of DGHS & DGFP Converted Sub-Assistant Community Medical Officer (SACMO) prime minister Sheike Hasina government, DGFP Implement it but DGHS no implement. In 2011 by the court order implement SACMO in DGHS Bangladesh.

From 2009 session Medical Assistant Course developed 4-year course (3 year Institution + 1 year Internship). Nowadays Medical Assistant Course conducted in 8 public institution & 146 private institution.

About 65% rural population receive primary medical treatment from Sub-Assistant medical officer (medical assistant). Medical Assistant no scope of Higher education & promotion. But Bongobondu sheike mujibur rahman government The First Five year plan[1973] page 520 & 521 brief details on Medical Assistant (After passing medical assistant course & 3 year service rural area in national service entering qualification of medical college for MBBS course).

==== Institution [MATS] ====
There are now 8 Government Medical Assistant Training Schools

- Tangail Medical Assistant Training School (Tangail MATS)
- Sirajgonj Medical Assistant Training School (Sirajgonj MATS)
- Kushtia Medical Assistant Training School (Kushtia MATS)
- Bagerhat Medical Assistant Training School (Bagerhat MATS)
- Noakhali Medical Assistant Training School (Noakhali MATS)
- Faridpur Medical Assistant Training School (Faridpur MATS)
- Jhenaidah Medical Assistant Training School (Jhenaidah MATS)
- Comilla Medical Assistant Training School (Comilla MATS)

There are 146 Private Medical Assistant Training Schools.

== Malaysia ==
Malaysia started training Medical Assistant in the early 1900s after independence from Britain. This profession has undergone several transformations over the decades in line with the current healthcare development in the country. The current name of this profession is Assistant Medical Officers (AMO), they are trained for three years in an undergraduate academic program (Diploma in Medical and Health Sciences or formerly known as Diploma in Medical Assistant) recognized by the Malaysian Qualifications Agency. In order to practice, all Assistant Medical Officers are compulsory to register under the regulating body of Malaysia Medical Assistant Board (Medical Assistant Act (registration),1977) and serve a compulsory resident posting for six months in Emergency and Trauma Department (Program Penempatan Wajib) under a clinical supervision by an Emergency Physician. Upon completing the compulsory posting, they will be deployed in public hospitals, parastatal institutions (e.g. military, prisons), rural health centers, health clinics, community clinics, aged care centers, or private specialist hospitals. To date, there are five training institutions introduced by the Ministry of Health, Malaysia in the public sectors to train new Assistant Medical Officers;

1. Training Institute of Ministry of Health Malaysia, Sultan Azalan Shah, Perak
2. Training Institute of Ministry of Health Malaysia, Johor Bahru, Johor
3. Training Institute of Ministry of Health Malaysia, Kuching Sarawak
4. Training Institute of Ministry of Health Malaysia, Kota Kinabalu, Sabah
5. Training Institute of Ministry of Health Malaysia, Seremban
6. Training Institute of Ministry of Health Malaysia, Kedah aining Institute of Ministry of Health Malaysia, Alor Setar, r

A registered Assistant Medical Officer can pursue their sub-specialty training (Post Basic certificates and Advanced Diploma) in various fields such as Emergency Medical and Trauma care, Primary Healthcare, Orthopedic, Cardio thoracic, Clinical Neuro-physiology, Sport Medicine, Anesthesiology, Diabetic care, Infection Control, hemodialysis, and many more. Assistant Medical Officer could also join the MBBS /MD after completing the undergraduate study by applying for those programs in either public or private institutions. Those who want to serve and continue as Assistant Medical Officer could further their study in a special programs for Assistant Medical Officers such as Bachelor of Science in Emergency Medicine with honors and Bachelor of Medical and Health Sciences with honors. Unlike Physician Assistant / Associate (PA) and Clinical Officer (CO), Assistant Medical Officer in Malaysia is also involved in Pre-Hospital Care as part of their job scope. Postgraduate programs available for Assistant Medical Officer includes Master in Medical Science (Public Health), Master in Risk Disaster Management, Master in Medical Science (Emergency Medicine), Master in Hospital Management and Health Economics as well as PhD in clinical or medical sciences fields.

== See also ==
- Allied health professions
- Clinical officer
- Healthcare in Kenya
- Paramedics
- Surgical technologists
- Clinical associates in South Africa
- Feldsher in countries of the former Soviet Union
