= Surgical technologist =

Surgical role

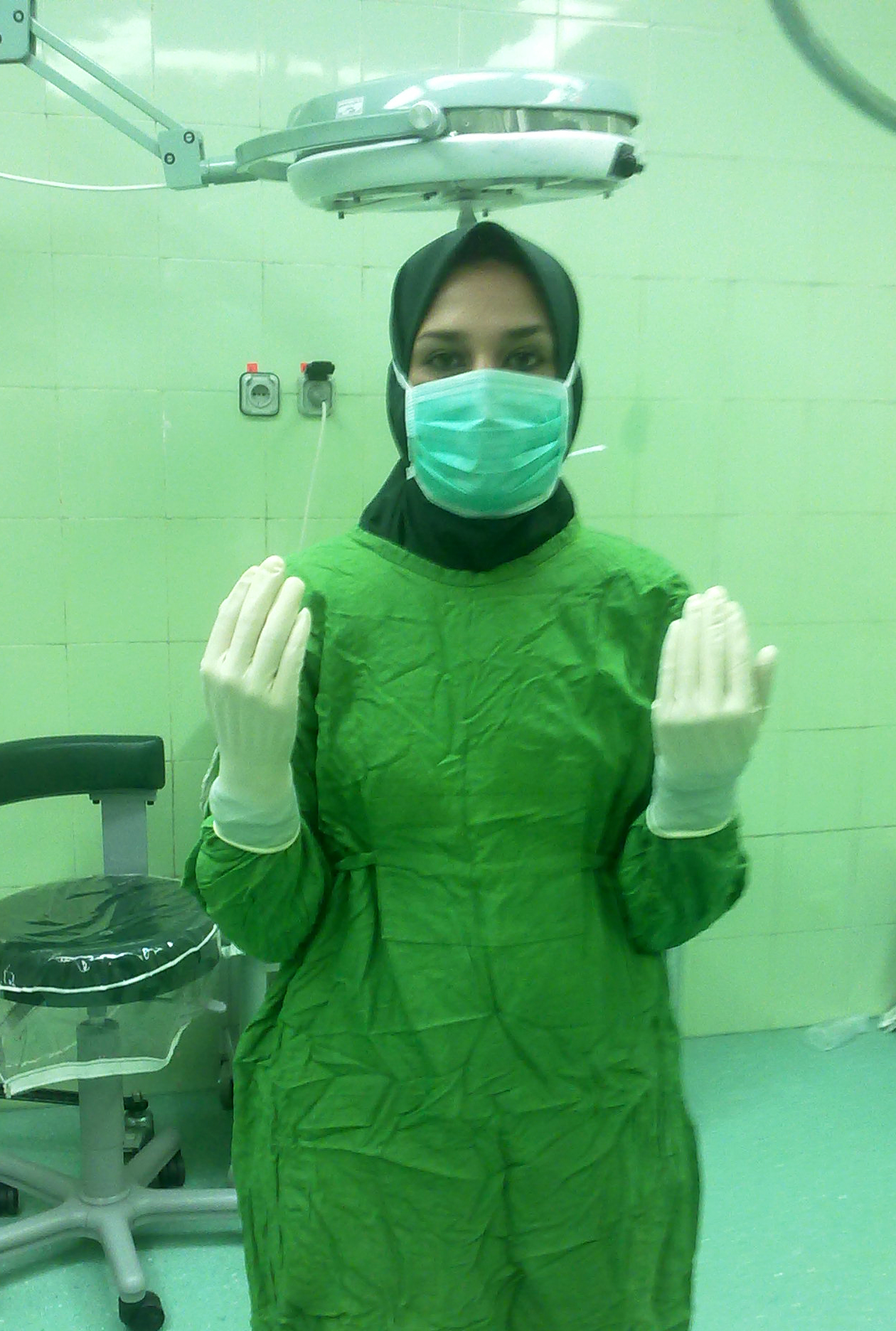
Surgical technologist demonstrating proper precautionary raised idle hand position

A surgical technologist (also called a surg tech, scrub, scrub tech, surgical technician, operating department practitioner or operating room technician) is an allied health professional working as a part of the team delivering surgical care. Surgical technologists are members of the surgical team, which include the surgeon, surgeon's assistant, scrub nurse, circulating nurse and anesthesia provider (anesthesiologist, anesthesiologist assistant or nurse anesthetist). They possess knowledge and skills in sterile and aseptic techniques. There are few mandatory professional requirements for surgical technologists, and the scope of practice varies widely across countries and jurisdictions. Surgical technologists attend junior colleges and technical schools, and many are trained in military schools. In the military they perform the duties of both the circulator and the scrub. The goal is for surgical technologists to be able to anticipate the next move the surgeon is going to make in order to make the procedure as smooth and efficient as possible. They do this by having knowledge of hundreds of surgical procedures and the steps the surgeon needs to take in order to complete the procedure, including the very wide range of surgical instruments they may need. Specialties can include, but are not limited to, the following: genitourinary, obstetrics and gynaecology, urology, ENT, plastics, general, orthopedics, neurology, and cardiovascular. They only work in surgical or perioperative areas and are highly specialized. Surgical technologist is the proper term for a two-year program which earns a degree in applied sciences. The profession is up and coming and highly in demand.

== Roles and Responsibilities ==
=== United States ===
In the U.S., surgical technologists are certified and work under the supervision of a surgeon, surgeon's assistant or other surgical personnel (such as a more senior technologist), to help ensure that the operating room environment is safe, equipment functions properly, and the operative procedure is conducted under conditions that maximize patient safety. Surgical techs are in the operating room before the patient is brought in, setting up the sterile back table(s) and mayo stand(s). They gown and glove the surgeons and assistants, sterile drape the patient, and stand right up next to/across from the surgeon and assist with the surgery. Scrubs are in charge of and handle the instruments, scrubs, sutures, implants, equipment and various surgical sponges, from extremely small, under 0.25 in (6.4 mm) square for neurosurgical procedures, to much larger lap sponges which are used during surgical procedures in or on larger areas of the body; irrigation fluids and medication. Surgical technologists play a critical role in maintaining the sterile field and supporting the surgical team throughout procedures. In addition to preparing instruments and supplies, they are responsible for anticipating the needs of the surgeon by selecting and passing instruments efficiently. This requires knowledge of surgical procedures, physicians, instrumentation, and sterile technique.

During operations, surgical technologists continuously monitor the sterile field to ensure aseptic conditions are maintained, reducing the risk of surgical site infections. They may also assist with tasks such as holding retractors, managing specimens, cutting suture, and performing surgical counts in collaboration with circulating nurses to ensure patient safety. The circulating nurse and surgical techs count all of the instruments and sterile supplies at least twice throughout the procedure, to make sure everything is accounted for. Surgical technologists also train other operating room personnel as a vital part of the surgical team.

=== Mozambique ===
In Mozambique, they provide advanced surgical services, often working autonomously in the absence of a physician.

== Employment ==
Surgical technologists in the United States often work in hospitals, primarily in operating rooms. Surgical technologists also deal with equipment, such as handling a C-arm fluoroscope in angioplasty and orthopedics. A surgical technologist with experience in multiple specialties is often preferred. Other scrub technologists may work in offices of physicians or dentists who perform outpatient surgery and in outpatient care centers, including ambulatory surgery centers. In the U.S., depending on the role and employment setting, surgical technologists may go by different titles including scrub surgical technologist or circulating surgical technologist. A few technologists in private practices (also called "private scrubs") are employed directly by surgeons who have special surgical teams, such as those for liver transplants.

== History ==
=== United States ===
The role of the surgical technologist began on the battlefields in World War I and World War II when the U.S. Army used "medics" to work under the direct supervision of the surgeon. Concurrently, medical "corpsman" were used in the United States Navy aboard combat ships. Nurses were not allowed aboard combat ships at the time. This led to a new profession within the military called operating room technicians (ORTs).

With many medical personnel overseas or performing duties in military hospitals, an accelerated nursing program with emphasis only on operating room technology was set up as an on-the-job training of nursing assistants who worked in the surgery department. These individuals studied sterilization of instruments and how to care for the patient in the operating room. Techniques, sutures, draping and instrumentation were emphasized; they also had to do clinical time in labor and delivery and the emergency room.

After the Korean War there were shortages of operating room nurses. Operating room supervisors began to recruit ex-medics and ex-corpsmen to work in civilian hospitals. These ex-military men functioned as circulators in the operating room while the scrub role or "instrument nurse" role was performed by the registered nurse. It was not until 1965 that these roles were reversed.

In 1967, the Association of periOperative Registered Nurses (AORN) published a book titled Teaching the Operating Room Technician. In 1968, the AORN Board of Directors created the Association of Operating Room Technicians (AORT). The AORT formed two committees in 1969, the Liaison Council on Certification for the Surgical Technologist or LCC-ST (now known as the National Board of Surgical Technology and Surgical Assisting or NBSTSA) and the Joint Committee on Education. The first certification examination was given in 1970, and those who passed the certification examination were given a new title: Certified Operating Room Technician (CORT).

In 1973, AORT became independent of AORN and changed the title of the position to what it is today, surgical technologist. The AORT also changed their name to the Association of Surgical Technologists (AST). In 1974, an accreditation body was established to ensure quality education. The programs accredited by ARC/STSA (Accreditation Review Committee for Surgical Technology and Surgical Assisting; formerly ARC-ST) are monitored for compliance with the standards. The ARC/STSA and AST board of directors recommends the associate degree as entry level surgical technology education.

Today, surgical technologists taking and passing the national certification examination designed by the NBSTSA earn the title of "Certified Surgical Technologist". Certification can be renewed by contact hours or re-examination. Laws for surgical technologists vary by state and many states are in various stages of legislation. Some require certification, some require state registration, and some have no laws at all.

=== Mozambique ===
Surgical technologists were introduced around 1984 in the aftermath of the Mozambican Civil War that had crippled the health sector. They are trained to provide comprehensive medical and surgical care, filling a gap created by the shortage of surgeons, especially in rural areas. Surgical technologists manage trauma and participate in obstetric and emergency surgeries. They may also serve as administrators at district-level hospitals. It is estimated that surgical technologists perform 90 percent of all obstetric surgeries in the country.

== Training, certification and professional organizations ==
=== United States ===
Educationally, surgical technologists graduate from surgical technology programs accredited through the Commission on Accreditation of Allied Health Education Programs (CAAHEP), which relies on information gathered by a collaborative effort of the Association of Surgical Technologists (AST) and the American College of Surgeons (ACS). The CAAHEP is a recognized accreditation agency of the Council for Higher Education Accreditation (CHEA). In addition, surgical technology programs are located in educational institutions that are institutionally accredited by agencies recognized by the U.S. Department of Education (USDE) or The Joint Commission. The ARC/STSA is also a member of the Association of Specialized and Professional Accreditors (ASPA).

The following statement was developed by the ACS's Committee on Perioperative Care, and approved by the ACS Board of Regents at its June 2005 meeting. This statement was subsequently approved by the AST, American Society of Anesthesiologists (ASA), American Association of Surgical Physician Assistants, American Association of Nurse Anesthetists, and American Society of PeriAnesthesia Nurses.

Surgical technologists are individuals with specialized education who function as members of the surgical team in the role of scrub person. With additional education and training, some surgical technologists function in the role of surgical first assistant. Surgical technology programs are inspected by the Accreditation Review Committee on Education in Surgical Technology—a collaborative effort of the Association of Surgical Technologists and the American College of Surgeons, under the auspices of the Commission on Accreditation of Allied Health Education Programs. Accredited programs provide both didactic education and supervised clinical experience based on a core curriculum for surgical technology.

Accredited programs may be offered in community and junior colleges, vocational and technical schools, the military, universities, and structured hospital programs in surgical technology. The accredited programs vary from nine to 15 months for a diploma or certificate to two years for an associates degree, which is the preferred entry level but not required.

Graduates of accredited surgical technology programs are eligible for certification by the National Board of Surgical Technology and Surgical Assisting (NBSTSA), an administratively independent body from the Association of Surgical Technologists consisting of representative Certified Surgical Technologists, a surgeon, and the public.

The American College of Surgeons strongly supports adequate education and training of all surgical technologists, supports the accreditation of all surgical technology educational programs, and supports examination for certification of all graduates of accredited surgical technology educational programs.

The professional organization for surgical technologists is the AST. Its primary purpose is to ensure that surgical technologists have the knowledge and skills to administer quality patient care and is the principal provider in conjunction with more than 40 state organizations of continuing education for surgical technologists. However, certifications are also available from the NBSTSA, the National Center for Competency Testing (NCCT), and the National Healthcare Association (NHA). These are the Certified Surgical Technologist (CST) credential, the Tech in Surgery-Certified (TS-C) credential, and the Certified Operating Room and Surgical Technician (CORST) credential, respectively.

A "Certified Surgical Technologist" must earn sixty credits to renew their credential with the NBSTSA. It is a two step process to renew their credential: submit continuing education credits (CEC) to the AST and submit the appropriate renewal form to the NBSTSA with the correct renewal fee.

NBSTSA renews a certification every two years. The renewal application must be submitted months before the expiration date. The expiration date is printed on the certification card or certificate. To renew a "Certified Surgical Technologist" credential is important to delivering the best care possible for the surgical patient.

== Gallery ==
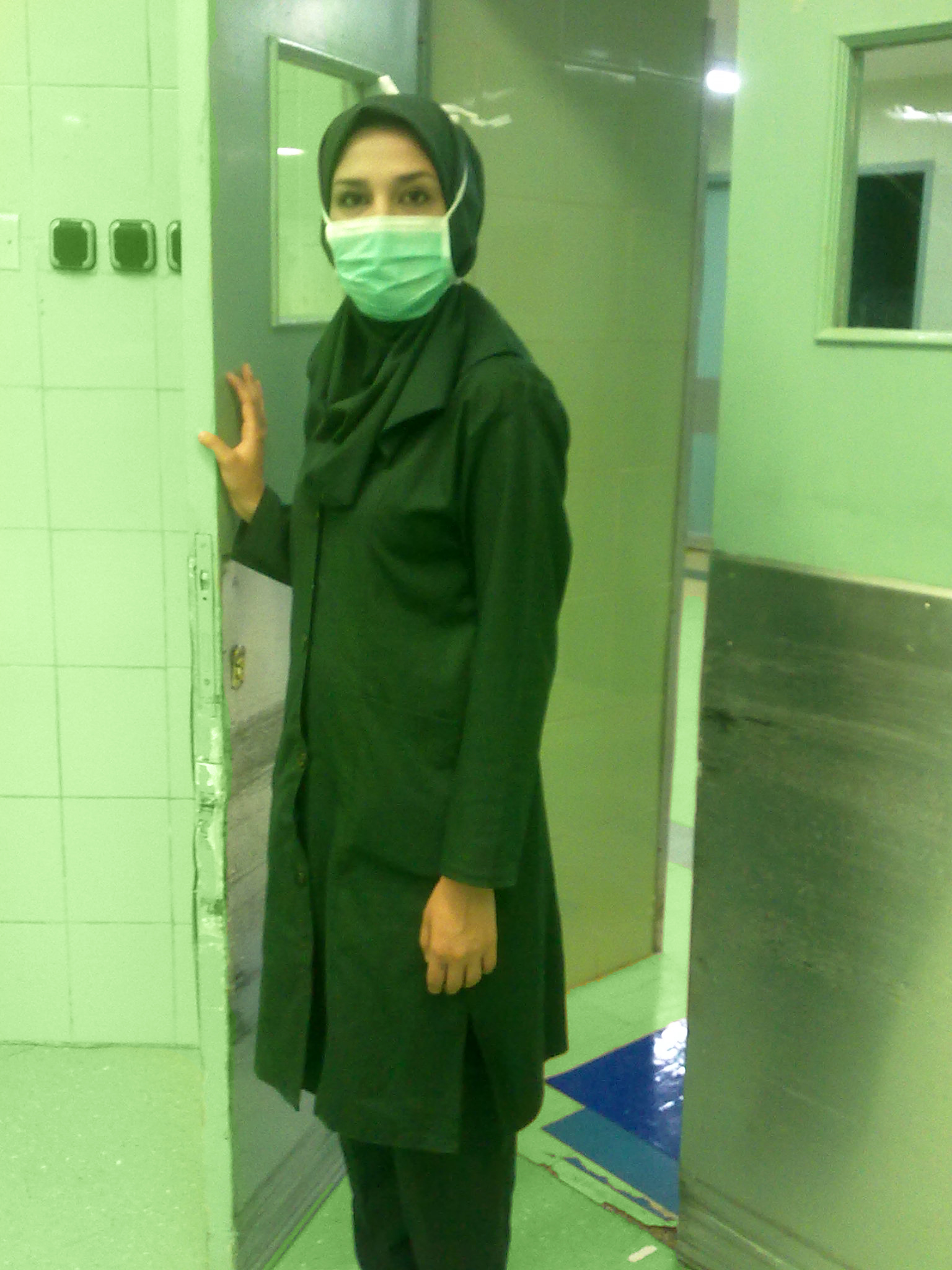

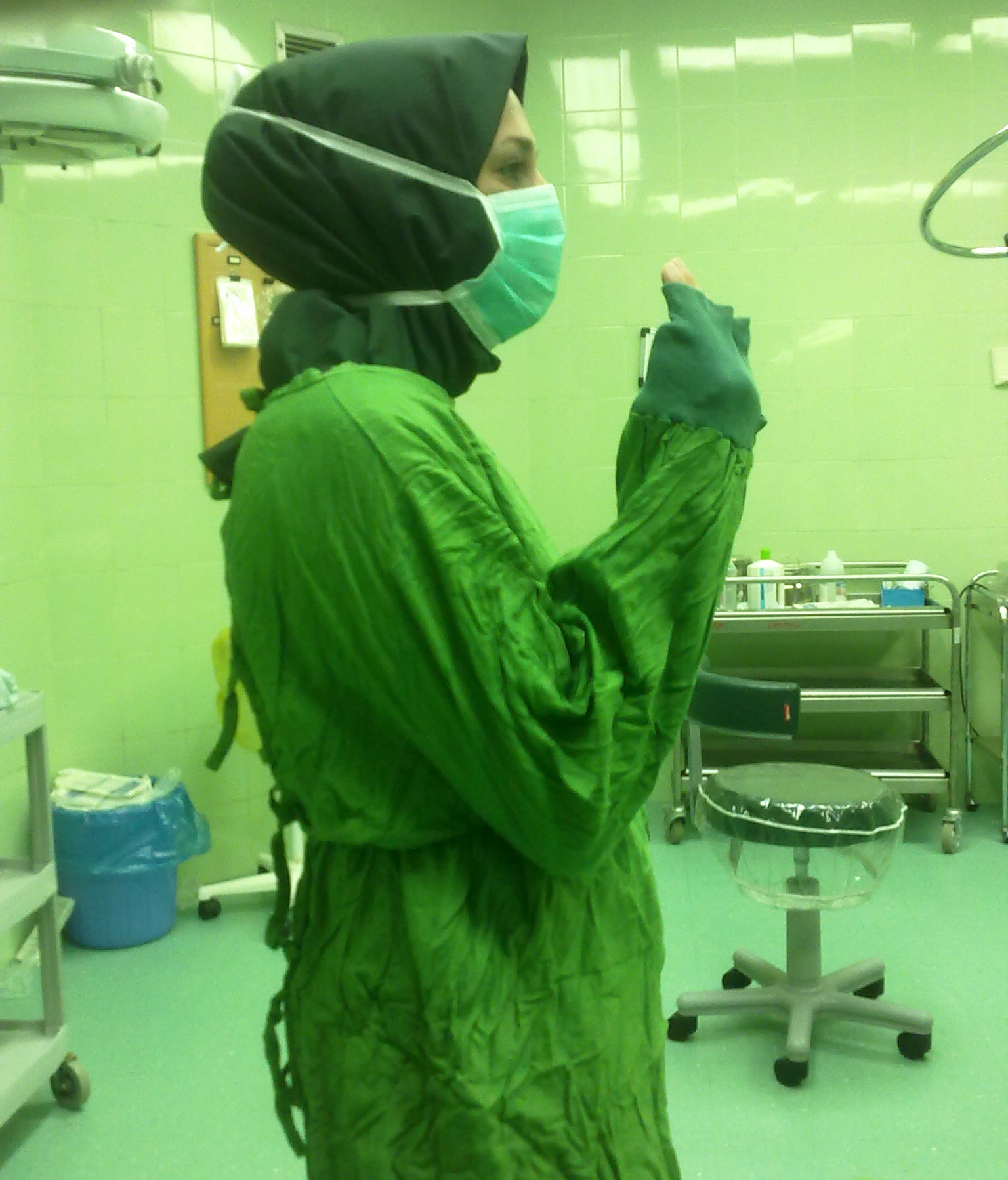
Demonstrating proper hand position and technique after gowning and before gloving

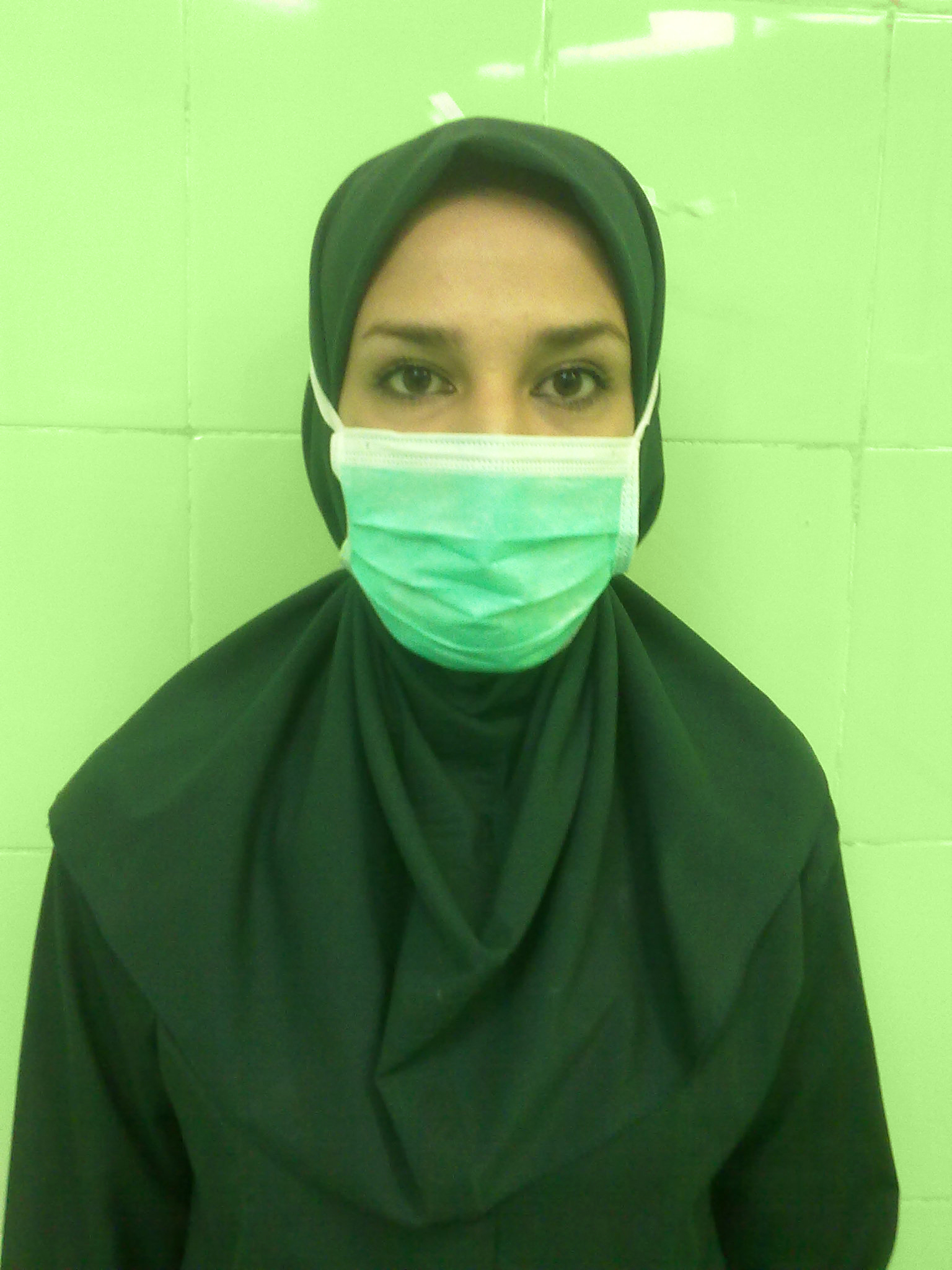

== See also ==
- Allied health professions
- Assistant Medical Officer
- Clinical associates
- Related article: Typical day in the OR as a Surgical Technologist
