= Mid-level practitioner =

Clinical health care provider

Occupation
- Synonyms: advanced practice practitioner, advanced practice provider, advanced practice clinician, advanced clinical practitioner, advanced clinical provider, non-physician practitioner, non-physician provider, physician assistant (hyponym), nurse practitioner (hyponym), advanced practice nurse (hyponym)
- Occupation type: Professional
- Activity sectors: Medicine, health care

Description
- Fields of employment: Clinics, hospitals

Mid-level practitioners, also called non-physician practitioners, advanced practice providers, or commonly mid-levels, are health care providers who assess, diagnose, and treat patients but do not have formal education or certification as a physician. The scope of a mid-level practitioner varies greatly among countries and even among individual practitioners. Some mid-level practitioners work under the close supervision of a physician (such as doing pre-op and post-op assessment and management, thus allowing surgeons to spend more of their time operating), while others function independently and have a scope of practice difficult to distinguish from a physician. The legal scope of practice for mid-level practitioners varies greatly among jurisdictions, with some having a restricted and well-defined scope, while others have a scope similar to that of a physician. Likewise, the training requirement for mid-level practitioners varies greatly between and within different certifications and licensures.

Because of their diverse histories, mid-level providers' training, functions, scope of practice, regulation, and integration into the formal health system vary from country to country. They have highly variable levels of education and may have a formal credential and accreditation through the licensing bodies in their jurisdictions. In some places, but not others, they provide healthcare, particularly in rural and remote areas, to make up for physician shortages.

== Definitions ==
The World Health Organization includes in this category all healthcare providers with all of the following qualifications:

- trained and legally authorized to provide healthcare,
- having at least two years training at university or other institution of higher education, and
- able to diagnose and treat medical conditions, within the scope of their training and licensure, by prescribing medication and/or performing surgery.

== MLPs by country ==
=== Canada ===
In Canada there are four "allied primary health practitioners" identified under the National Occupational Classification (NOC) section 3124: physician assistant, nurse practitioner, midwife, and anesthesiologist assistant. Nurse practitioners are permitted to provide several, but not all, of the health care services physicians provide.

=== India ===
In 2016, a new mid-level healthcare provider role was introduced in India(Dealing With modern Medicine), known as Community Health Officer (CHO) or Nurse Practitioner, Physician Associate/Assistant. The role was intended to support the community-level Health and Wellness Centres in India. Community Health Officers (CHOs) and Physician Associate/Assistant (PA), also called Mid Level Health Providers (MLHPs) and non-physician practitioners(Physician Associate/Assistant), are trained in Health Sciences model who have a defined scope of modern medicine practice. In India, Nursing, AYUSH and Healthcare Professionals (Healthcare profession like Physiotherapy, Physician Assistant/Associate, Optometrist Etc. prescribed in NCAHP ACT 2021, NCAHP, MOHFW, Government of India)are eligible for this cadre. This means that they are trained in Modern Health Sciences model and legally permitted to provide healthcare in fewer situations than physicians but more than other health professionals. In India, Community Health Officer or Nurse practitioner, Physician Associate/Assistant are other names for mid-level practitioner. Apart from doctor and nurses there was a list of Healthcare providers as recently NCAHP, Ministry of Health and Family Welfare published Guideline in Ayusman Bharat digital Health Mission control of health related cases in rural areas of India. According to these guidelines, symptomatic cases can be triaged at village level by tele-consultation with a Physician Associate/Assistant or a Community Health Officer (CHO).

=== South Africa ===
In 2008, a new mid-level practitioner role was introduced in South Africa, known as clinical associates. The role was intended to support the district hospital workforce.

=== United Kingdom ===
Mid-level practitioners in the UK are known as Advanced Clinical Practitioners (ACP) or Advanced Practitioners (AP) and occurred as an evolution of many differing professions which use various titles such as 'Extended Scope Practitioner'. Historically there has been debate over the consistency of quality in these senior clinicians and therefore it became necessary to generate a distinguished definition of the ACP role.

The ACP:

- Is a registered healthcare practitioner with a minimum of 5 years clinical experience (2 years in a senior clinical role)
- Has acquired expert knowledge and complex decision-making skills which may be an extension of their traditional scope of practice
- Will undertake a two-year level 7 (Master's degree) training course in Advanced Practice
- Will maintain training and CPD requirements

ACPs may practice in the acute setting (ED, critical care, etc.) or community General Practice / Family Medicine. The majority can independently assess, investigate (through blood tests / imaging etc.), diagnose and formulate a treatment plan including prescribing medications or referring to specialist care.

The deployment of ACPs is considered to be part of a Value Based Recruitment framework driven by Health Education England (HEE). This seeks to appoint clinicians based upon their competencies, values and behaviours in support of collaborative working and delivering excellent patient care.

==== Physician Associates ====
Physician Associates (PAs) practising in the United Kingdom is the equivalent title to physician assistant, these clinicians are described as "dependent practitioners", meaning that they require supervision at all times by a physician. They cannot prescribe medications nor can they request tests that use ionising radiation such as X-rays.

=== United States ===
In the United States, mid-level practitioners are health care workers with training less than that of a physician but greater than that of nurses or medical assistants.

The term mid-level practitioner or mid-level provider is related to the occupational closure of healthcare. This concept centered around physicians as the ultimate professional responsible for healthcare. As healthcare demands have increased in the United States due to an aging population, a physician shortage and the implementation of the Patient Protection and Affordable Care Act of 2010 there has been a shift toward more independence in practice for professionals such as physician assistants, nurse practitioners, pharmacists, and dental therapists.

==== Concerns about terminology ====
In recent years some organizations and specialties have proposed the discontinuance of the term mid-level in reference to professional practitioners who are not physicians. Each organization prefers to use their specific title, and physicians' organizations are concerned about title inflation.

Professional Health Care Organizations' positions on the term mid-level practitioner.
Organization	Position	Preferred Alternative	Position paper
The American Academy of Physician Associates	Against	PA*	A Guide for Writing and Talking About PAs (PDF), American Academy of Physician Associates, 2018
The American Academy of Nurse Practitioners	Against	Nurse practitioner	Use of Terms Such as Mid-Level Provider and Physician Extender, American Academy of Nurse Practitioners, 2015
American Association of Nurse Anesthesiology	Against	Nurse anesthetist, nurse anesthesiologist	"CRNAs should not be referred to as "mid-level practitioners," "nonphysicians," "physician extenders," "dependent practitioners," or "allied health practitioners" – position statement". Issuu. American Association of Nurse Anesthesiology. 2019. Devi, Sharmila (2011). "US nurse practitioners push for more responsibilities". The Lancet. 377 (9766): 625–626. doi:10.1016/S0140-6736(11)60214-6. S2CID 54401967.
American Academy of Family Physicians	Against use of "provider" in general	specific titles	"Provider, Use of Term (Position Paper)". American Academy of Family Physicians.

*preferred even over physician assistant, which was what the acronym historically stood for

==== Drug Enforcement Administration ====
The term mid-level practitioner as found in the DEA classification in Section 1300.01(b28), Title 21, of the Code of Federal Regulations is used as a means of organizing drug diversion activities. The term mid-level practitioner as defined by the DEA Office of Diversion Control, "...means an individual practitioner, other than a physician, dentist, veterinarian, or podiatrist, who is licensed, registered, or otherwise permitted by the United States or the jurisdiction in which he/she practices, to dispense a controlled substance in the course of professional practice." Some health professionals considered mid-level practitioners by the United States DEA include:

- Ambulance services
- Animal shelters
- Certified chiropractors
- Doctors of Oriental Medicine
- Euthanasia technicians
- Homeopathic physicians
- Medical psychologists
- Naturopathic physicians
- Nurse practitioners (including nurse midwives, nurse anesthetists, and clinical nurse specialists)
- Optometrists
- Physician assistants
- Registered pharmacists

== See also ==
- Advanced practice nurse
- Allied health professions
- Anesthesiologist Assistant
- Certified Nurse‐Midwife
- Feldsher
- Health human resources
- Nurse anesthetist
- Nurse practitioner
- Pathologists' assistant
- Physician assistant
