= Assistant doctor (China) =

Licensed healthcare workers in China

Assistant doctors are licensed healthcare workers in China that are graduates of three-year medical training institutions.

China has a three-tier 3-5-7 healthcare system composed of assistant doctors, who train for 3 years; doctors, who train for 5 years; and medical scientists, who train for 7 years at the university.

== See also ==
- Clinical associates
- Clinical officer
- Health extension officers
- Physician assistant
