= Feldsher =

Health care professional

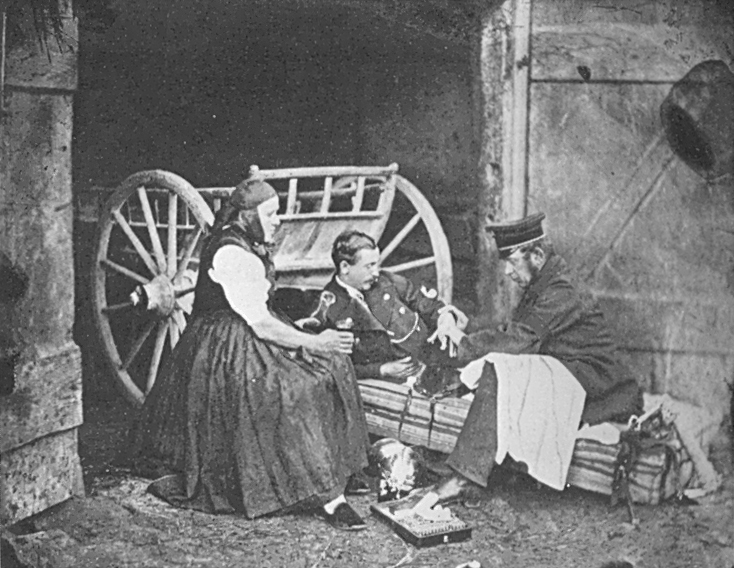
German Feldscher in the Franco-Prussian War 1870

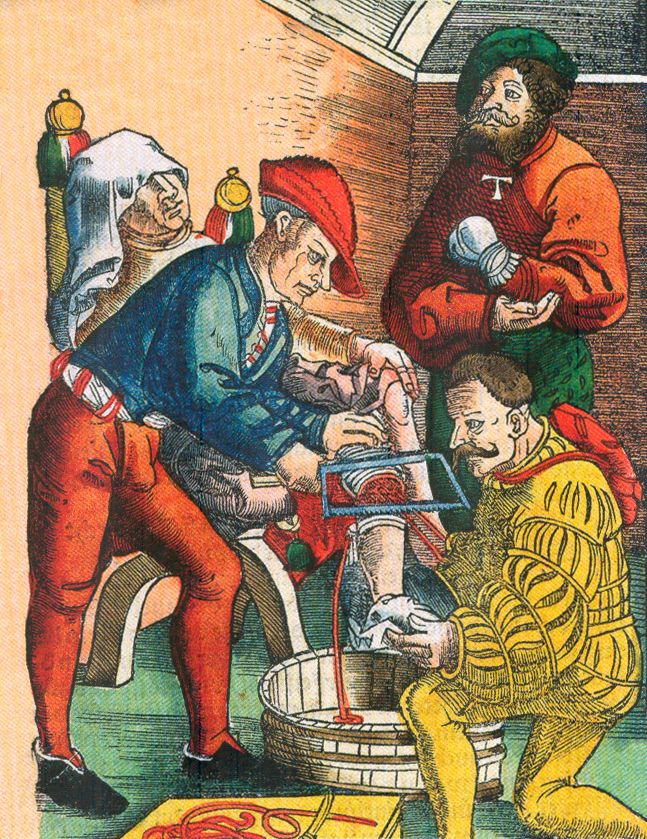
A feldsher performing an amputation. Engraving from 1540

A feldsher (German: Feldscher, Polish: Felczer, Danish: Feltskærer,Czech: Felčar, Hungarian: Felcser, Russian: фельдшер, Swedish: Fältskär, Finnish: Välskäri) is a health care professional who provides various medical services limited to emergency treatment and ambulance practice. As such, a feldsher is one kind of mid-level medical practitioner.

In Russia, Ukraine and in other countries of the former Soviet Union, feldshers provide primary-, obstetric- and surgical-care services in many rural medical centres and clinics across Russia, Armenia, Kazakhstan, Kyrgyzstan, Mongolia and Uzbekistan.

Similar types of mid-level practitioners are known by different titles in different countries, including advanced practitioner (United Kingdom), clinical associate/clinical officer (in parts of sub-Saharan Africa), community health officer (India), nurse practitioner (Australia, Canada and US), and physician assistant (Canada and US). The International Standard Classification of Occupations, 2008 revision, collectively groups such workers under the category paramedical practitioners.

== History ==
The word Feldsher is derived from the German Feldscher, which was coined in the 15th century. Feldscher (or Feldscherer) literally means "(battle-)field shearer" and was the term used for barber surgeons in the German and Swiss armies from the 17th century until professional military medical services were established, first by Prussia in the early 18th century. Today, Feldshers do not exist in Germany anymore, but the term was exported with Prussian officers and nobles to Russia. An All-Russia Union of Feldshers was founded in 1905. They were regarded as "Middle Medical Workers".

The Feldsher system of rural primary care provided some of the inspiration for China's barefoot doctors.

Today feldshers can be found in every medical setting from primary to intensive care. They are often the first point of contact with health professionals for people in rural areas.

== Education and training ==
Training for feldshers can include up to four years of post-secondary education, including medical diagnosis and prescribing. They have clinical responsibilities that may be considered midway between physicians and nurses. They do not have full professional qualifications as physicians.

The training program typically includes basic pre-clinical sciences: anatomy, physiology, pharmacology, microbiology, laboratory subjects, etc.; and advanced clinical sciences: internal medicine and therapeutics, neurology and psychiatry, obstetrics, infectious diseases and epidemiology, preventive medicine, surgery, and trauma, anesthesiology and intensive care, pediatrics, and other clinical subjects such as ophthalmology, otorhinolaryngology, dermatology, and sexually transmitted infections, ambulance service and pre-hospital emergency medicine, and battlefield medicine.

== See also ==
- Barber surgeon
- Allied health professions
- Clinical officer, a similar category of health care provider in sub-Saharan Africa
- Health care providers
- Medical assistant
- Mid-level practitioner
- Nurse practitioner
- Physician assistant, a similar category of health care provider in the United States
