= AORN Journal =

- Discipline: Nursing
- Language: English
- Edited by: Laurie Saletnik

Publication details
- History: 1963–present
- Publisher: Wiley for Association of periOperative Registered Nurses (United States)
- Frequency: Monthly

Standard abbreviations
- ISO 4: AORN J.

Indexing
- CODEN: AOJOEL
- ISSN: 0001-2092
- LCCN: 67004489
- OCLC no.: 1460484

Links
- Journal homepage; Online access

The AORN Journal is a peer-reviewed nursing journal in the field of perioperative nursing and is the official journal of the Association of periOperative Registered Nurses (AORN).

== Abstracting and indexing ==
The journal is covered by the following abstracting and indexing services: CINAHL, Index Medicus/MEDLINE, the Hospital Literature Index, the International Nursing Index, and RNdex Top 100.
