= Laurie Saletnik =

Laurie A. Saletnik is a registered nurse. She is the Senior Director of Nursing for Perioperative Services at Johns Hopkins Hospital and has served as Editor‐in‐Chief for the Association of periOperative Registered Nurses journal AORN since 2017.
