= Clinical Officers Council =

Kenyan government agency

- Abbreviation: COC
- Predecessor: Ministry of Health (MOH)
- Formation: 1989
- Founded at: Nairobi
- Type: State corporation
- Legal status: Active
- Purpose: Medical licensing
- Headquarters: Nairobi
- Region served: Kenya
- Chairman: Prof. Simon kang'ethe
- Members: Dr. Joseph K. Choge Felix Mwenda Mutua; Albert Wagurah Taiti; Philip Musyimi Mwololo; Edwin Nyabuga Makori Hariet Wakiuru Njiru
- Registrar: Manasseh Bocha
- CEO: Mutinda Kissing'u
- Parent organization: Government of Kenya (GOK)
- Website: www.clinicalofficerscouncil.org

The Clinical Officers Council of Kenya (COC) is a government agency – a corporate body created by the Clinical Officers (Training, Registration and Licensing) Act no. 20 of 2017 – Laws of Kenya whose work is to supervise and control the training and professional practice of medicine, dentistry, orthopaedics and health work by clinical officers and to register and license clinics and medical centres. A person who is registered by the Clinical Officers Council is entitled to render medical services in any approved institution and may, with respect to patients, examine, diagnose, order laboratory and imaging investigations, prescribe treatment and perform procedures as per their scope of training.

== History ==
Historically styled after the United Examining Board which could award GMC-registrable diplomas known as the Conjoint and Triple Qualification to university and non-university-trained doctors in the UK between 1884 and 2007, this new Kenyan legislation is a modern law which came into effect in 2017 after repealing of an old act and has been updated (by court order and under the Health Laws (amendment) Act No. 5 of 2019) to align with Universal Health Care and to comply with the country's constitutional and legal requirements.

== Functions ==
The functions of the Clinical Officers Council are to:

- advise the government on policy matters relating to clinical medicine practice
- prescribe the minimum educational entry requirements for persons wishing to be trained as clinical officers
- approve institutions other than those established or accredited under the Universities Act, 2012 for the training of clinical officers
- establish, approve and accredit programs for continuing professional educational programs
- register and license clinical officers for the purposes of this Act
- maintain a register and records of all clinical officers registered under this Act
- cause to be published in the Kenya Gazette every calendar year the names of all registered clinical officers
- promote development and adoption of codes of practice
- regulate the professional conduct and ensure the maintenance and improvement of the standards of practice of clinical medicine
- collaborate with other medical professional associations, organisations and other relevant bodies, in the furtherance of the functions of the council and those bodies
- consider and deal with any other matter pertaining to clinical officers including prescribing badges, insignias or uniforms to be worn by clinical officers and
- carry out other functions related to the implementation of this Act.

== Members ==
The clinical officers council is made up of the following members:

- A chairperson who is appointed by the President and has (i) a relevant bachelor's degree from a recognised university (ii) at least ten years' relevant experience and (iii) is registered as a clinical officer under this Act
- The Director General for health or his or her designated representative
- The Chief Clinical Officer
- One clinical officer elected by members of the faculty of Clinical Medicine at the Kenya Medical Training College
- One clinical officer representing the Kenya Clinical Officers Association who is nominated by the Association and appointed by the Cabinet Secretary
- One clinical officer representing universities training clinical officers who is elected by the teaching staff from among their number
- The Registrar who is an ex-officio member and secretary to the Council
- Two clinical officers, one in public practice and the other in private practice from each gender who are nominated by the Cabinet Secretary
- One person with knowledge and expertise in finance or audit who is appointed by the Cabinet Secretary
- One person representing the public who is nominated by consumer organisations and appointed by the Cabinet Secretary.

=== The disciplinary committee ===
The Disciplinary Committee of the clinical officers council is a quasi-judicial body which is made up of the Principal Secretary in the Ministry of Health and the Attorney General (or their representatives) plus four clinical officers serving in various capacities and has powers to:

- Receive and investigate complaints made against clinical officers
- Enter and inspect any establishment or premises operated by a clinical officer under investigation
- Seize and remove any object from any premises which may be related to the matter under investigation
- Request the Attorney-General, the Director of Public Prosecutions or both to provide advice on any recommendation made by the committee in an inquiry
- Request and receive assistance from the police or any other governmental body or person as necessary in the enforcement of its powers
- Regulate its own procedures

== See also ==
- Kenya Union of Clinical Officers
- Kenya Clinical Officers Association
