= Bachelor of Clinical Medicine and Community Health =

The Bachelor of Science in Clinical Medicine and community health/ Bachelor of Science in clinical medicine/ Bachelor of Science in clinical medicine, surgery and community health/ Bachelor of clinical medicine and community health (Kampala International University) is an academic dual/triple degree awarded to Clinical officers by universities in East Africa. In Kenya, it is currently offered by Great Lakes University of Kisumu, Kabarak university, Mount Kenya University, Kenya Methodist University, University of Kabianga and Meru University of Science and Technology (MUST), Masinde Muliro University of Science and Technology (MMUST) Jomo Kenyatta University of Technology (JKUAT) Kaimosi Friends University (KAFU) Egerton University, Kisii University, Kirinyaga University and Uzima University. In Uganda and Tanzania, it is offered at Kampala International University. In Rwanda, it is offered at the University of Rwanda.,

Bachelor of Science in clinical medicine/ Bachelor of Science in clinical sciences is also offered in Zambia in various universities such as Eden University, Copperbelt University. The graduates of this course are referred to as Bsc Clinical Officers in Kenya. However, in Zambia, their designation was changed from clinical officers to medical licentiates. In Tanzania, their designation was changed from clinical officers/assistant medical officers to Medical Officers and are given the title of a doctor to their name and allowed to practice and specialize as doctors in that country and even abroad.

Duration of study:

The degree takes four years to complete plus one year paid internship for a high school graduate while it takes three years for a diploma graduate in clinical medicine.

Curriculum:

The current curriculum for Bachelor of Science degree in clinical medicine, (surgery) and community health has been derived from the Bachelor of Medicine and Bachelor of Surgery (MBBS) version hence it is a crashed program of MBBS. It takes four and half years to train MBBS in India and four years in USA, UK, Cuba and other countries for accelerated programs for high school leavers and those who have a prior Bachelor of Science degrees and diplomas and degrees in health related fields.

Specialization:

There are various specialization that the graduates can embark on, for instance Masters in clinical medicine ( Paediatrics and Child Health, Reproductive Health, Oncology) offered at Kirinyaga University, Masters of clinical medicine (Oncology) offered at Jomo Kenyatta University of Science and Technology, Masters of clinical medicine; Coroner and forensic medicine, Family medicine, Emergency medicine) offered at Mount Kenya University. Other graduates undertake the masters of medicine (Radiology, Internal medicine) like in the case of Tanzania and others pursue Master of science degrees in overseas countries.

== See also ==
- Bachelor of Clinical Medical Practice
