= Kenya Clinical Officers Association =

- Service to Uphold Total Health
- Abbreviation: KCOA
- Established: 1962; 64 years ago
- Type: Professional association
- Headquarters: Nairobi
- Location: Kenya
- Methods: Training, conferences, and advocacy
- Field: Clinical officers
- Members: 5,000 (2026)
- Official language: Kenyan English
- Website: kecoa.org

The Kenya Clinical Officers Association (KCOA) is a professional medical association whose membership is open to all clinical officers who are registered by the Clinical Officers Council and are licensed to practice medicine in Kenya.

== See also ==
- Kenya Union of Clinical Officers
