= Kenya Union of Clinical Officers =

KUCO
- Kenya Union of Clinical Officers
- Founded: 2009
- Headquarters: Nairobi, Kenya
- Location: Kenya
- Field: Clinical officers
- Key people: Peterson Wachira; George Gibore; Mary Boniface
- Website: kuco.or.ke

The Kenya Union of Clinical Officers (KUCO) is a registered trade union whose membership is open to all Clinical officers who are registered or licensed to practice medicine in Kenya.

KUCO initially applied for registration as the Union of Kenya Clinical Officers in 2009 but the application met firm resistance from the government and rival trade unions leading to a long drawn court case and a judgment against registration. It had, as of July 2012, interim registration with the Registrar of Trade Unions. Undeterred, the union pressed on and applied for fresh registration as KUCO. This led to a second court case that ended in protests around the courts and a violent police crackdown that left many of the protesting clinical officers bleeding and nursing serious injuries. The court eventually ruled in favour of the clinical officers and the union was finally registered in 2017.

== See also ==
- Clinical Officers Council
- Kenya Clinical Officers Association
