= Health care license =

Health care license may refer to:

- Medical license for physicians
- Nurse license for nurses
- Any other license for other health care providers, such as optometrists, pharmacists, dentists, clinical laboratory personnel, etc.
