= Surgical nursing =

One of the specialties of nursing

A surgical nurse, also referred to as a theatre nurse or scrub nurse, specializes in perioperative care, providing care to patients before, during and after surgery. To become a theatre nurse, Registered Nurses or Enrolled Nurses complete extra training. Surgical nurses may assist in any type of surgery. Surgical nurses may work in hospitals or outpatient surgical centers.

There are many different phases during surgery where the surgical nurse is needed to support and assist the patient, surgeons, surgical technicians, anesthesiologists and other medical staff. Pre-operative, nurses help to prepare the patient and operating room for the surgery. During the surgery, they assist the anaesthetist and surgeons when they are needed. Post-operative nurses ensure that the patients are provided with suitable care and treatments following surgery.

In the UK and Australia, surgical patients (those who have undergone a minor or major surgical procedure) are attended to on different wards from medical patients. Nursing practice on surgical wards differs from that of medical wards.

== Duties ==
Surgical nurses work alongside other medical staff throughout the surgical process. In surgery there are three main phases: preoperative, intraoperative and postoperative. These phases collectively are known as the perioperative period. Each phase is related to specific activities carried out and skills needed for different stages of nursing.

=== Preoperative Phase ===
This stage is undertaken when the patient prepares to have surgery. It may include discussing with the patients all the benefits of the procedure but also the dangers that could occur. This is an opportunity for the patient to discuss any concerns they may have. When assigned, the theatre nurses must make sure that the patients are in good condition before going ahead with the surgery.

=== Intraoperative Phase ===
This stage begins when the ward nurse, who has prepared the patient for surgery, delivers the patient and their notes to the theatre and/or anaesthetic nurse. Many checks are undertaken at this stage to ensure a safe environment for the patient and the theatre staff. The theatre nurse works to maintain a sterile environment and to ensure the surgical equipment is working well. The nurse also organises all surgical instruments and ensures all supplies needed during the surgery are available.

=== Postoperative Phase ===
This phase begins when the theatre/anaesthetic nurse delivers the patient's notes to the nurses and staff in the Post-Anaesthetic Care Unit (PACU). This can also be known as the recovery room. Here the nurse's immediate attention is on checking the patient's airway and breathing. In this phase nurses also attend to pain relief and any other complications following surgery. These nurses, often in day surgery cases, attend to provide patients and their caregivers with support and instructions and requirements needed for home care.

The first twenty-four hours post surgery are critical, and many procedures are required to monitor the patient. Often, observations of the patient need to be taken and recorded every fifteen minutes. General observations include heart rate, blood pressure, temperature, respiratory rate and oxygen saturation. Further post-operative tasks for a surgical nurse include: urine output, assessment of wound sites, replacing intravenous requirements and reporting any abnormalities.

== Credentials ==
=== Australia ===
To become a surgical nurse, one must have undertaken appropriate training, and be registered with the state nursing board (Nursing and Midwifery Council, UK; An Bord Altranais, Rep. of Ireland). In Australia, both Registered Nurses and Enrolled Nurses work in surgical wards. Registered nursing received their training over a longer period of time, as they receive a university degree. To become a registered nurse you must complete a bachelor's degree of nursing which takes up to 3 years. Enrolled Nurses complete a Diploma of Nursing which is a full-time course over 12 –16 months at Technical and Further Education (TAFE).

In Australia, the education standards are nationwide, requiring an undergraduate nursing degree and graduate diploma in perioperative nursing. The undergraduate degree has a full-time study duration of three years at the University of Notre Dame. The post graduate diploma in preoperative nursing has some prerequisites including; undergraduate nursing degree, be a full-time employee of the Fremantle Health Service, hold a current licence to practice as a level one registered nurse and have at least one year of postgraduate experience. With these qualifications it is possible to become a surgical nurse in Australia.

The Graduate Diploma in Perioperative Nursing is available 1 year full-time or equivalent part-time and is developed to qualify the registered nurse to enhance knowledge and combine skills to work as a specialist within the perioperative field.

== Types of surgical nurse ==
In the operating room there are two main types of nurses: a scrub nurse and a circulating nurse. The scrub nurse must be familiar with and educated about every piece of operational equipment; as on request they are required to provide the surgeons with the equipment needed. The scrub nurse is also responsible for making sure all operating equipment is accounted for before and after the operation.

Scrub nurses may prepare the operating room and participate in hands-on care of the patient during surgery within the sterile field.

A circulating nurse has many similar responsibilities; they should ensure that the operating room is clear and uncontaminated by previous surgeries or other infections. They are also there to collect, open, clear and sterilise packets containing surgical equipment.

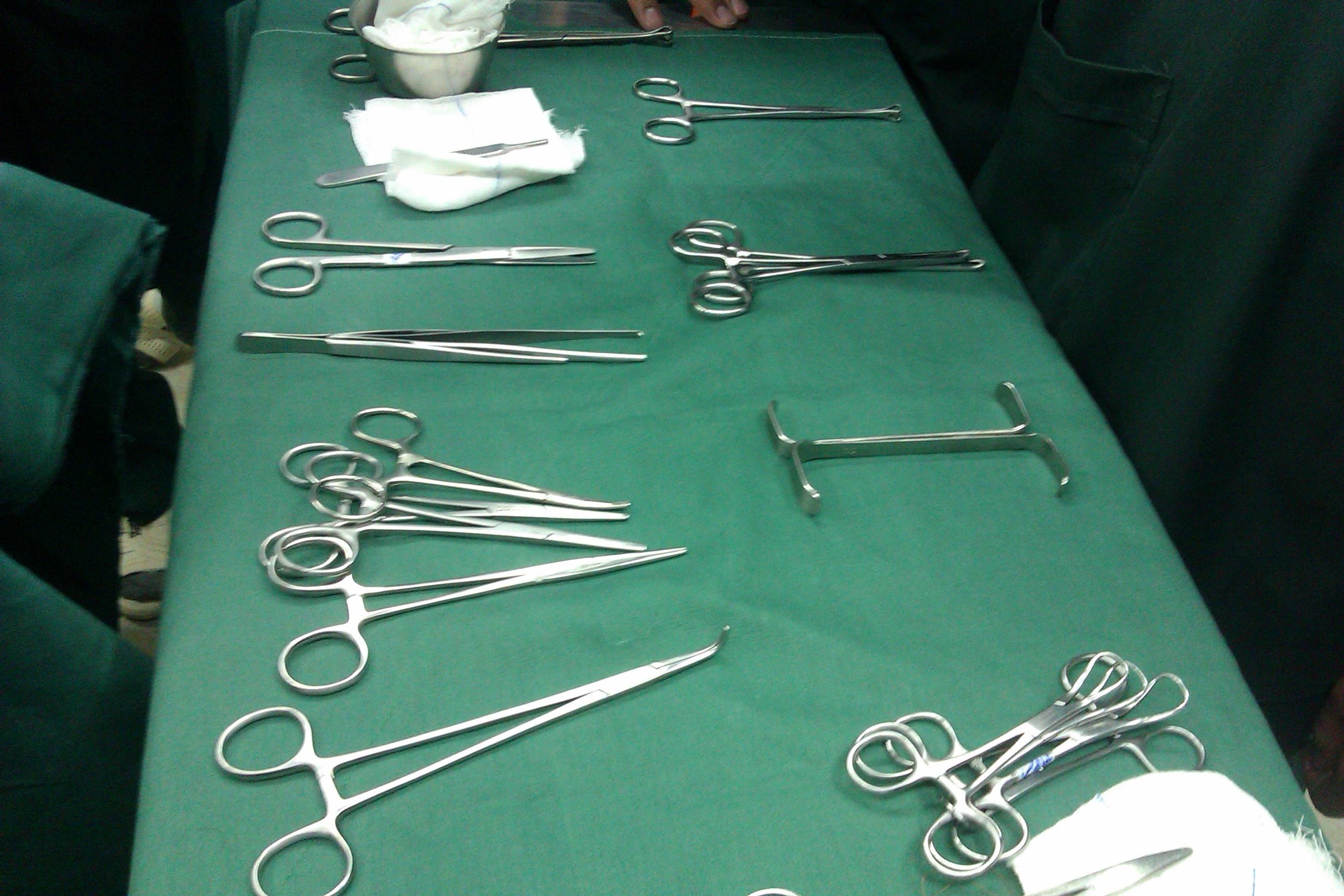
Surgical instruments on a trolley in preparation for surgery.

== Surgical nurse interaction with patients ==
Surgical nurses must have a thorough understanding of their roles and interactions with patients and their immediate families within a surgical care environment. One vital role for a surgical nurse is to provide support and confidence to their patient while they are in hospital. Nurses must possess good communication skills and maintain a professional relationship with their patient. It is important for the nurse to build a trusting relationship with their patient. Due to the fast-paced surgical surroundings, there is little time for surgical nurses to provide information and reassurance before and after surgery. Many patients feel vulnerable and anxious prior to their surgical procedure and it is important for the surgical nurse to recognise their patient's need for psychological support. It is therefore important for the surgical nurse to understand their role in relation to the patient. By understanding the emotional needs of their patients, surgical nurses’ perspectives and conduct towards their patient will influence the patient's experience.

=== Preoperative instruction ===
Preoperative instruction, when delivered competently, is an important aspect of patient care. Positive effects of preoperative teaching include a reduction in patients’ anxiety levels, healing time, complications post- surgery, pain relief usage and an increase in satisfied and co-operative patients in regard to their procedure and treatment. Preoperative teaching is essential to a patient's understanding of the surgical procedure and to help them prepare for postoperative healing.

Preoperative teaching is usually undertaken before the day of surgery. This can be delivered by verbal and/or written instructions. Patients may also have an appointment scheduled with the perioperative nurse to talk over any concerns regarding the procedure. Teaching is further discussed on the day of surgery and also before the patient is discharged to leave the hospital.

== Career path ==
=== Australia ===
Nurses who work in the operating theatre become specialists in the field or a specific sub speciality. Once a nurse finds a specialist field or specific sub-speciality they enjoy working in, the nurse will commence as a junior nurse. After gaining a large amount of knowledge and skills set with experience, if the nurse chooses to become more of an expert in this field, the theatre nurse may do a postgraduate certificate or diploma to become a Clinical Nurse for that speciality. As of March 2016, the salary for a surgical nurse in Australia can range from $47,721 to $80,160 with an average of $57,103.
