= Health extension officer =

Health extension officers or health extension workers (HEWs), are a category of health care providers found in some countries including Papua New Guinea and Ethiopia. They usually work in health centres in rural and medically underserved areas, where they see and treat patients and provide a range of community health services.

== Health Extension Officer (HEO): Papua New Guinea by Frank Yagahe ==
In 1967 the Health Extension (HEO) program was transferred from the Papuan Medical College in Port Moresby to the College of Allied Health Sciences in Madang, formally known as the Paramedical College. In February 2002, the College of Allied Health Sciences amalgamated with the Faculty of Health Sciences at Divine Word University (DWU). It offered a three-year Diploma in Health Sciences (Health Extension) program. The three-year program was extended to four years of study in 2008 for a Bachelor of Health Sciences (Rural Health) award.

The Bachelor of Health Sciences (Rural Health) program is designed to equip students with the most current knowledge, skills, appropriate behaviours and attitudes to deliver an acceptable level of clinical healthcare, public health, administrative and management skills. The emphasis is on rural areas where more than 80% of the nation’s population lives. The medical program places a special emphasis on training healthcare givers who can work with limited resources and often in the most isolated areas.

The HEOs are trained to work in the Rural Health Center. The study program is provided by the DWU. The program focuses on preparation for clinical and administrative practices in the rural areas of Papua New Guinea where health services are at most times neglected. The four-year training program includes theoretical study in medicine, minor surgery, pediatrics, obstetrics and gynecology, health awareness, health research, rural health facility and health project management, etc. Students are trained to manage in hospitals and health centres. The HEOs are responsible for patient care, the administration of the local health centre, and the coordination of community health services in the rural and rugged terrains of PNG.

They are here to serve their country with loyalty and dedication, where there is no doctor. .

== Ethiopia ==
In Ethiopia, against a backdrop of acute physician shortage, Health Extension Workers are assigned to local health posts and provide a package of essential interventions to meet population health needs at this level. Through the national Health Extension Program, HEWs are recruited among high school graduates in local communities, and undergo a one-year training program to deliver a package of preventive and basic curative services that fall under four main components: hygiene and environmental sanitation; family health services; disease prevention and control; and health education and communication.

== See also ==
- Clinical associates
- Clinical officers
- Community health workers
- Health workforce
- Physician assistants
