= Anesthesia provision in the United States =

Field of medicine in the United States

In the United States, anesthesia can be administered by physician anesthesiologists, an anesthesiologist assistant, or nurse anesthetist.

== Anesthesia providers ==
=== Anesthesiologists ===
Anesthesiologists are physicians (MD/DO) specializing in the practice of anesthesiology.

The training of a physician anesthesiologist typically consists of four years of college, four years of medical school, one year of internship, and three years of residency optionally followed by a one-year fellowship in a sub-specialty. It is the highest training level for all practitioners delivering anesthesia in the United States. While most physicians practicing anesthesiology in the United States pass a comprehensive board exam, board certification is not required in order to practice anesthesiology. Physicians who have successfully completed training in an ACGME accredited program become board eligible at the time of graduation and may practice anesthesiology until board certification is attained, commonly within one year post graduation. According to an American Society of Anesthesiologists (ASA) press release Anesthesiologists provide or participate in more than 90 percent of the 40 million anesthetics delivered annually.

Other specialties within medicine are closely affiliated to anesthesiology. These include intensive care medicine and pain medicine. Specialists in these disciplines have completed training in anesthesia including a three-year residency in anesthesia with an additional year in an accredited fellowship in a sub specialty of anesthesia (e.g. Pain, Critical Care Medicine, Obstetric Anesthesia, Pediatric Anesthesia). Anesthesiology is not limited to the operating room. Physician anesthesiologists are termed "peri-operative physicians", and are involved in optimizing the patient's health before surgery, performing the anesthetic and associated procedures (e.g. neuraxial anesthesia, specialized intravascular access), following up the patient in the post-anesthesia care unit and post-operative wards, and ensuring optimal analgesia throughout. Some sub-specialty physician anesthesiologists are an integral member of the critical care team in Surgical Intensive Care Units (SICU) and manage complex surgical patients throughout their hospitalization.

=== Certified Registered Nurse Anesthetists (CRNA) ===
Certified Registered Nurse Anesthetists are advanced practice registered nurses specializing in the provision of anesthesia care. As of 2018, CRNAs represent more than 50% of the anesthesia workforce in the United States, with 52,000 providers, according to the American Association of Nurse Anesthetists, and administer more than 40 million anesthetics each year. Thirty-four percent of nurse anesthetists practice in communities of less than 50,000 due to the rural pass-through program where "eligible hospitals may use reasonable-costs based Part A payments in lieu of the conventional Part B payments as a rural practice inducement for nurse anesthetists to practice in small, underserved rural hospitals.

CRNAs begin their education with a four-year Bachelor of Science degree, followed by at least one year of critical care nursing experience (most trainees enter with 3-6 years of critical care nursing experience), and completion of the CCRN certification. After 3 years of intensive didactic and clinical anesthesia training, they obtain a doctorate of nursing degree and they must then pass the NBCRNA national certification exam.

CRNAs care for patients pre-, intra-, and postoperatively and practice in all facets of anesthesia care. They may care for patients independently but also work collaboratively as part of the healthcare teams. Some choose to narrow the focus of care to sub-specialize in the provision of cardiac, pediatric, pain, or obstetrical care. CRNAs administer anesthesia in all types of surgical cases, and are able to apply all of the accepted anesthetic techniques—general, regional, local, or sedation independently without supervision of a physician anesthesiologist.

As of 2022, 19 governors opted out of the CRNA supervision requirement of the Centers of Medicare and Medicaid Services (CMS).

=== Anesthesiologist Assistants ===
Anesthesiologist assistants are advanced non-physician anesthesia providers qualified by graduate medical education and clinical training to work under the direction of an anesthesiologist in developing and implementing the anesthesia care plan. The anesthesiologist assistant is a nonphysician anesthesist in the Anesthesia Care Team (ACT) with a limited scope of practice compared to certified registered nurse anesthetists (CRNAs) as they cannot practice independently of an anesthesiologist. Anesthesiologist assistants obtain pre-anesthetic health histories, perform preoperative physical exams, establish non-invasive and invasive monitors, perform all types of intubations and airway management techniques, administer medications/IV fluids/blood products, evaluate and treat life-threatening situations, and execute all forms of anesthesia including the induction, maintenance, emergence and recovery of general, local, sedation and regional anesthetic techniques.

Anesthesiologist assistants generally work in the hospital setting but can work at any location including pain clinics, dental offices and surgical care centers. Anesthesiologist assistants work under the medical direction of physician anesthesiologists in surgical environments such as cardiac surgery, neurosurgery, transplant surgery, and trauma surgery centers. The incorporation of anesthesiologist assistants into ACT teams across the country is a dynamic process, and currently there are sixteen states, as well as Washington, D.C., and the Veteran's Affairs Medical System. In each of these states, the anesthesiologist assistant falls under the regulatory authority of the State Board of Medicine.

As of 2017 there are twelve anesthesiologist assistant training programs in the United States all of which offer degrees at the Master's level. Approximately 97% of currently practicing anesthesiologist assistants hold a master's degree (some early anesthesiologist assistant graduates held bachelor's degrees). All newly credentialed and future anesthesiologist assistants must complete an accredited Master's program for anesthesiologist assistants. Upon completion of the educational program, graduates must sit for a credentialing exam that is co-validated by the National Board of Medical Examiners and National Commission for Certification of Anesthesiologist Assistants. All anesthesiologist assistant programs are credentialed by the Commission on Accreditation of Allied Health Educational Programs (CAAHEP)

=== CMS "Opt-Out" Federal Supervision Requirement ===
Effective November 13, 2001, CMS established an exemption for Certified Registered Nurse Anesthetists (CRNAs) from the physician supervision requirement. This exemption recognized a Governor's written request to CMS attesting that he or she is aware of the state's right to an exemption of the requirement for CRNA to be supervised by a physician. The attestation recognizes that it is in the best interests of the State's citizens to exercise this option in order to provide safe, cost-effective, valuable anesthesia services and especially helps assure the provision of those services to all citizens.

Requirements for “Opt-Out” Of Federal Supervision Requirement • The federal requirement has been that CRNAs must be supervised by a physician. The November 13, 2001 rule allows states to "opt-out" or be "exempted" (the terms are used synonymously in the November 13 rule) from the federal supervision requirement.

• For a state to "opt-out" of the federal supervision requirement, the state's governor must send a letter of attestation to CMS. The letter must attest that: a. The state's governor has consulted with the state's boards of medicine and nursing about issues related to access to and the quality of anesthesia services in the state; and b. That it is in the best interests of the state's citizens to opt-out of the current federal physician supervision requirement; and c. That the opt-out is consistent with state law.

As of March 2020, nineteen states have chosen to opt-out of the CRNA physician supervision regulation. The states are: Alaska, Arizona, Colorado, California, Idaho, Iowa, Kansas, Kentucky, Minnesota, Montana, Nebraska, New Hampshire, New Mexico, North Dakota, Oregon, Oklahoma, South Dakota, Washington, and Wisconsin.

=== Anesthesia Care Teams ===
According to the ASA statement on the Anesthesia Care Team, anesthesia care personally performed or medically directed by an anesthesiologist constitutes the practice of medicine. According to the American Association of Nurse Anesthetists and state law in all fifty states, anesthesia care provided by a Certified Registered Nurse Anesthesiologist is considered the practice of nursing. Certain aspects of physician directed anesthesia care may be delegated to other trained and credentialed professionals, including anesthesiologist assistants and CRNAs.

== Laws regarding anesthesia provision ==
It has been established that, under US law, anesthesia is practice of both medicine and nursing. Frank v. South, Chalmers-Francis v. Nelson and other court decisions determined that anesthesia was the practice of Nursing as well as Medicine. As such, the practice of anesthesia in the US may be delivered by a physician anesthesiologist, an anesthesiologist assistant or a Certified Registered Nurse Anesthesist. The decisions have not been challenged since the Dagmar Nelson case. In addition to legal decisions, individual hospital and surgical facility policies also regulate the granting of anesthesia clinical privileges and are often based on contractual agreements with provider groups.

== See also ==
- ASA physical status classification system
