= Kenya Medical Training College =

Kenyan state corporation for training health care workers

- Motto: Training for better health
- Location: Nairobi, Kenya; 1.3008°N 36.8078°E
- Website: kmtc.ac.ke

The Kenya Medical Training College (KMTC) is a state Corporation under the Ministry of Health entrusted with the role of training of the various health disciplines in the health sector, to serve the local, regional and international markets. The College aligns its strategies to those of the health sector, which in turn draws its focus from the national Agenda.

== Foundation ==
In 1990, an act of Parliament under the Ministry of Health established KMTC.

== Academics ==
KMTC is a college with a majority of enrollments in certificate, diploma and post basic diploma levels. The college has been accredited by the Ministry of education and is under the Ministry of Health.

KMTC operates on an academic calendar with two distinct semesters. The first semester begins during early September to late January. The second semester begins in early February to late July.

KMTC students use a combination of the department's course number and the number assigned to the class to identify their subjects.

=== Courses ===
KMTC currently offers more than 126 courses at certificate, diploma, and higher diploma levels

==== Main programs ====
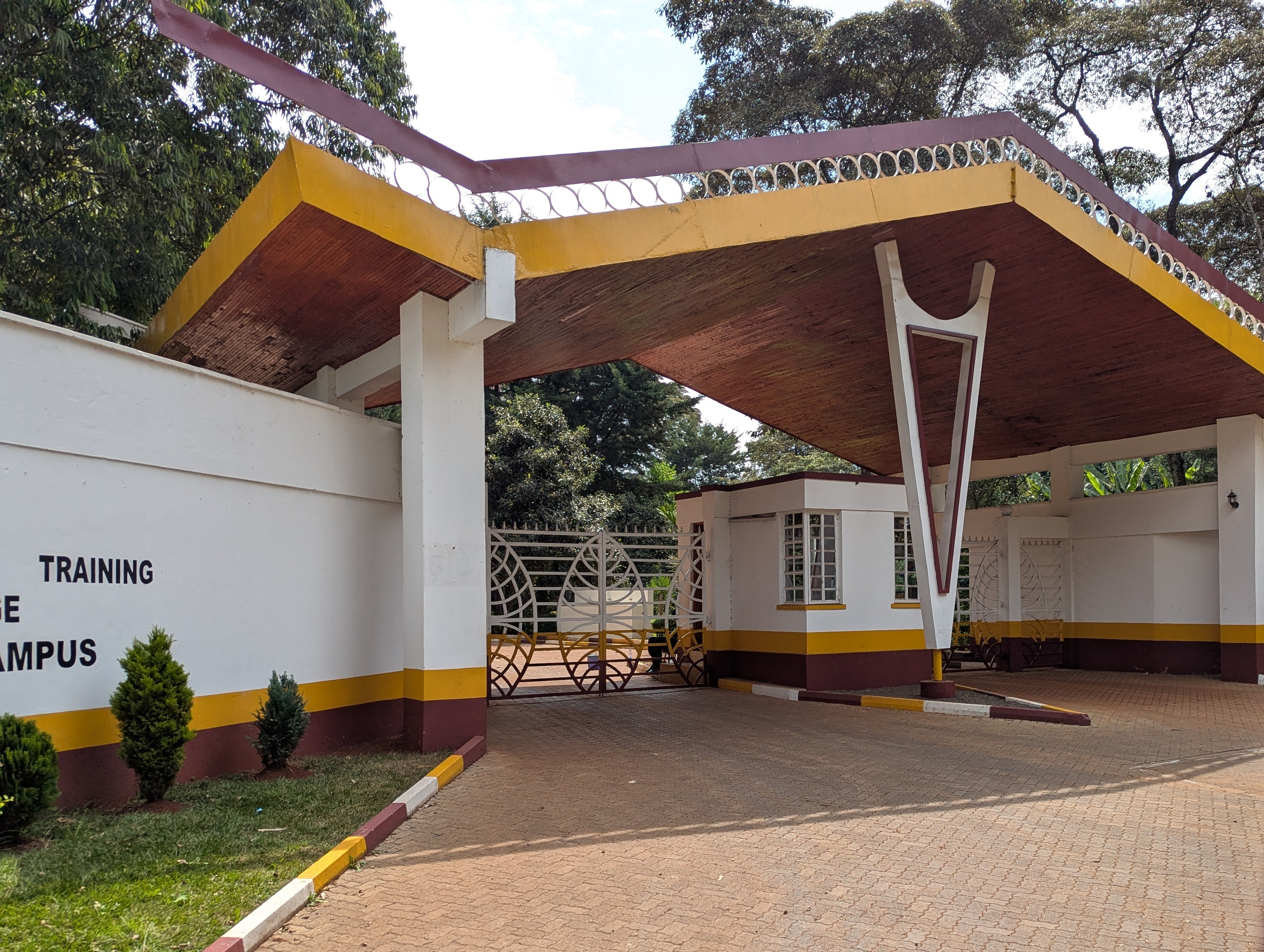
Entrance to the Karen Campus

The main programs offered include:

1. Clinical Medicine (basic and higher diploma)
2. Community Nutrition (certificate and diploma)
3. Community Oral Health (diploma)
4. Dental Technology (diploma)
5. Environmental Health (diploma and higher diploma)
6. Health Education (higher diploma)
7. Health Records and Information (certificate and diploma)
8. Medical Education (higher diploma)
9. Medical Engineering (certificate, diploma and higher diploma)
10. Medical Imaging Science (diploma and higher diploma)
11. Medical Laboratory Science (diploma and higher diploma)
12. Nursing (certificate, diploma and higher diploma)
13. Occupational Therapy (diploma)
14. Optometry (diploma and higher diploma)
15. Orthopaedic Technology (diploma)
16. Pharmacy (diploma and higher diploma)
17. Physiotherapy (diploma)
18. Orthopaedic Plaster Technology (certificate)
19. Registered Nursing-Mental Health and Psychiatry (diploma)
