= Kenya Gazette =

Government gazette of Kenya

- Type: Weekly newspaper
- Owner: Government of Kenya
- Publisher: Kenya Government Press
- Language: English
- Headquarters: Nairobi, Kenya
- OCLC number: 3156440

The Kenya Gazette is an official publication of the government of the Republic of Kenya, a government gazette.

== Contents ==
The Kenya Gazette publishes the following:

- Notices of new legislation
- Notices required to be published by law or policy
- Announcements for general public information
- "Gazetted officers," which are public administrators and official subject-matter experts who may use government letterheads, process government documents or work outside the civil service through a special license.

== Publication frequency ==
Publication takes place every week, usually on Friday, with occasional releases of special or supplementary editions within the week.

== Archive search ==
A search engine for the Kenya Gazette Archive has been developed by the National Council for Law Reporting and Google Inc to enable full-text search within and across Kenya Gazette editions spanning over a century.
