= Community diagnosis =

Community diagnosis is the identification and quantification of health problems in a given population using health indicators to define those at risk or those in need of care and the opportunities and resources available to address these factors.
