= Medical Practitioners and Dentists Board =

Medical Practitioners and Dentists Board Logo

The Medical Practitioners and Dentists Board is the regulatory body for the practice of medicine and dentistry in Kenya. It is a state corporation established under Cap 253 Laws of Kenya and its mission is to ensure the provision of quality and ethical health care through appropriate regulation of training, registration, licensing, inspections and professional practice.
