= Perioperative nursing =

Nursing specialty

Perioperative nursing is a nursing specialty that works with patients who are having operative or other invasive procedures. Perioperative nurses work closely with surgeons, anaesthesiologists, nurse anaesthetists, surgical technologists, and nurse practitioners. They perform preoperative, intraoperative, and postoperative care primarily in the operating theatre.

Also known as operating room nurses or OR nurses, perioperative nurses are registered nurses (RNs) who work in hospital surgical departments, day-surgery units (also called ambulatory surgery units), clinics, and physicians' offices. They help plan, implement, and evaluate treatment of the surgical patient and may work closely with the patient, family members, and other health care professionals.

== Becoming a perioperative nurse ==
To work in the OR in a preoperative, intraoperative or postoperative nursing role in the United States, you must have a degree in nursing and pass the NCLEX-RN licensing exam. Your nursing education should include supervised clinical experience in surgical nursing, critical care or emergency room care to show you know what it takes to work in a fast-paced, high-stakes care environment.

Many hospitals offer perioperative internship programs to gain this practice experience. These can include AORN's Periop 101 curriculum, a widely recognized program that offers RNs exposure to the latest surgical nursing standards of care and is used in over 2,500 hospitals across the United States.

== Perioperative nursing salary ==
Surgical nursing salaries start just under $70,000 for staff nurses in the United States and can increase to well over $100,000 for OR nurses working in advanced clinical and administrative positions.

In the United Kingdom perioperative nurses ranges from £24,907 to £37,890 depending on Agenda for Change pay band and experience.

== Perioperative nursing roles ==
Perioperative nurses may perform several roles depending on the country they practice in, including circulating, instrument (or scrub) nurse, preoperative (or patient reception) nurse, Post Anaesthetic Care Unit or recovery nurse, registered nurse first assistant (RNFA), and patient educator.

=== Circulating nurse ===
The circulating nurse is a perioperative nurse who assists in managing the nursing care of a patient during surgery. The circulating nurse observes for unintended breaches in surgical asepsis and coordinates the additional needs of the surgical team, such as procuring extra instruments, monitor operating room conditions, and liaising the communication with other medical, nursing and ward staff. The circulating nurse is not scrubbed in the case but rather manages the care and environment during surgery.

=== Instrument nurse ===
An instrument or scrub nurse is a perioperative nurse who works directly with the surgeon within the sterile field. The main responsibilities of the scrub nurse is to manage the sterile instruments and equipment, perform counts to ensure that items are not inadvertently left inside the surgical wound, anticipate the surgeon's needs and pass required instruments and equipment to the surgeon. Other duties can also include surgical site preparation, sterile draping. Some scrub nurses also suction, irrigate and retract for minor procedures. The title "scrub nurse" comes from the requirement to scrub their hands and arms with special disinfecting solutions.

=== RN First Assistant ===
An RNFA is the surgeon's assistant and is extremely qualified in providing extended perioperative nursing care. The role also includes preoperative, intraoperative, and postoperative care of the patient.

=== Perianaesthesia nursing ===
The perianaesthesia nurse (recovery nurse) provides intensive nursing care to patients after they wake from anaesthesia. This nurse cares for and monitors patients to make sure they are not nauseated or disoriented.

== See also ==
- Association of periOperative Registered Nurses
- Perianesthesia nursing
