= Assistant physician =

In the United States, an assistant physician (AP) is a medical doctor or doctor of osteopathic medicine who has graduated from a four-year medical school program and is licensed to practice, in a limited capacity, under the supervision of a physician who has completed their residency. In 2020 the AP licences were authorized and issued in Missouri, Kansas, Arizona, Utah, and Arkansas. By 2024 the program has also passed into effect in Alabama, Florida, Idaho, Louisiana, Maryland, Tennessee and Texas. To be licensed, APs must have graduated from medical school and passed the USMLE Step 1 and USMLE Step 2 Clinical Knowledge exams. The expansion of the AP profession aims to provide primary care in underserved areas. The position also provides a career pathway for the increasing number of unmatched physician graduates.

In the United Kingdom, before the establishment of the National Health Service in 1948, an AP was a junior physician attached to a hospital.
