= Association of periOperative Registered Nurses =

Professional organization

- Abbreviation: AORN
- Formation: 1949
- Type: Professional organization
- Purpose: Professional
- Headquarters: Denver
- Region served: United States
- Members: Perioperative nurses
- Official language: English
- Website: www.aorn.org

The Association of periOperative Registered Nurses (AORN) represents more than 41,000 registered nurses in the United States and abroad who facilitate the management, teaching, and practice of perioperative nursing, or who are enrolled in nursing education or engaged in perioperative research. Its members also include perioperative nurses who work in related business and industry sectors.

== History ==
The first groups of organized OR nurses were concerned with many of the same issues AORN and the profession of OR nursing face today, including standardizing OR techniques and education programs and promoting friendship among OR nurses. Between 1916 and 1949, several OR nursing groups formed in various parts of the United States, leading to the formal recognition of AORN as a national association. Major milestones in the association's history include:

- The first national conference in 1954
- The establishment of a constitution, bylaws, and national officers, the AORN Board of Directors
- The establishment of the AORN Journal in 1963
- Standards for Administrative and Clinical Practice in the Operating Room, now called Perioperative Standards and Recommended Practices, a booklet first published in 1965

AORN is also involved in efforts that advance perioperative professionals and their profession. These activities include:

- Offering educational opportunities that specifically address the perioperative setting
- Setting standards for perioperative care and demonstrating how best practices can be implemented in the day-to-day work environment
- Facilitating a community of perioperative professionals that enables sharing of best practices
- Creating awareness and celebrating the value and skills of the perioperative nurse
- Empowering perioperative registered nurses to engage in efforts to shape legislative and health policy issues
- Securing resources to enable advancements in education and research in perioperative surgical care

== AORN Surgical Conference & Exposition ==
The AORN Surgical Conference & Exposition is the largest education and networking conference of perioperative nurse professionals in the world, and the largest surgical products trade show in the US. To date there have been a total of 62 Congresses dating back to 1954.

=== List of past and upcoming congresses ===
1. New York, Feb. 1-3, 1954
2. St. Louis, Jan. 24-27, 1955
3. Boston, Jan. 30 - Feb 1, 1956
4. Los Angeles, Feb. 18-21, 1957
5. Philadelphia, Feb. 10-13, 1958
6. Houston, Feb. 9-12, 1959
7. New York, Feb. 22-26, 1960
8. San Francisco, Feb. 13-17, 1961
9. Denver, Feb. 19-22, 1962
10. Washington, DC, Feb. 18-21, 1963
11. Dallas, March 2–5, 1964
12. New York, Feb. 7-11, 1965
13. Chicago, Feb. 20-24, 1966
14. San Diego, Feb. 19-23, 1967
15. Boston, Feb. 18-22, 1968
16. Cincinnati, Feb 24-27, 1969
17. Anaheim, Feb. 22-26, 1970
18. Las Vegas, Feb. 8-12, 1971
19. Houston, Jan. 29-Feb. 2, 1972
20. Chicago, March 17–23, 1973
21. New Orleans, Feb. 10-15, 1974
22. Dallas, March 23–28, 1975
23. Miami, March 7–12, 1976
24. Anaheim, March 20–25, 1977
25. New Orleans, March 12–17, 1978
26. St. Louis, March 4–9, 1979
27. Atlanta, March 9–14, 1980
28. Dallas, March 8–13, 1981
29. Anaheim, March 7–12, 1982
30. Houston, April 10–15, 1983
31. Atlanta, March 4–9, 1984
32. Dallas, Feb, 24 - March 1, 1985
33. Anaheim, March 9–14, 1986
34. Atlanta, April 5–10, 1987
35. Dallas, March 6–11, 1988
36. Anaheim, Feb. 19-24, 1989
37. Houston, March 18–23, 1990
38. Atlanta, April 7–12, 1991
39. Dallas, March 15–20, 1992
40. Anaheim, Feb 28 - March 5, 1993
41. New Orleans, March 13–18, 1994
42. Atlanta, March 5–10, 1995
43. Dallas, March 3–8, 1996
44. Anaheim, April 6–11, 1997
45. Orlando, March 29 - April 2, 1998
46. San Francisco, March 28 - April 1, 1999
47. New Orleans, April 2–6, 2000
48. Dallas, March 11–15, 2001
49. Anaheim, April 21–25, 2002
50. Chicago, March 23–27, 2003
51. San Diego, March 21–25, 2004
52. New Orleans, April 3–7, 2005
53. Washington, DC, March 19–23, 2006
54. Orlando, March 11–15, 2007
55. Anaheim, March 30 - April 3, 2008
56. Chicago, March 15–19, 2009
57. Denver, March 13–18, 2010
58. Philadelphia, March 18–24, 2011
59. New Orleans, March 24–29, 2012
60. San Diego, March 2–7, 2013
61. Chicago, March 29 - April 2, 2014
62. Denver, March 7–11, 2015
63. Anaheim, April 2–6, 2016
64. Boston, April 1–5, 2017
65. New Orleans, March 24–28, 2018
66. Nashville, April 6–10, 2019
67. New Orleans, March 19–23, 2022
68. San Antonio, April 1–4, 2023
69. Nashville, March 9–12, 2024
70. Boston, April 5–8, 2025
71. New Orleans, April 11-14, 2026
72. Philadelphia, April 10-13, 2027
73. Atlanta, April 22-25, 2028
74. Nashville, April 14-17, 2029

== Perioperative Nurse Week ==
In 1979, the AORN approved a resolution to promote consumer education and enhance public knowledge of perioperative nurse. November 14 was designated as OR Nurse Day, later it expanded to a week. Since 1979 individual members, AORN chapters, hospitals, and other medical facilities have organized special events and utilized other forms of publicity to help educate the public about the diverse roles performed by perioperative registered nurses. In 2000, OR Nurse Week was renamed to Perioperative Nurse Week to broaden the term. It always occurs in the second week of November.

== Collaboration with Mercy Ships ==
At the 56th annual entered into a partnership with Mercy Ships, a leading non-profit in providing free healthcare in the third world, in an effort to boost the health care accessibility and opportunities for international collaborations.
