= Clinical associates =

Category of health professional in South Africa

Clinical associates are a category of health professional found in South Africa. They assess patients, make diagnoses, prescribe treatment and perform minor surgery under the supervision of a physician.

Registration with the Medical and Dentists Board requires a Bachelor of Clinical Medical Practice degree – a three-year program offered at the Walter Sisulu University since January 2008 and now also offered at the University of Witwatersrand and University of Pretoria.

== Worldwide ==
Similar health workers are called clinical officers in other parts of Africa, physician assistants in the US and feldshers in parts of the former Soviet Union – all grouped under "paramedical practitioners" in the International Standard Classification of Occupations, 2008 revision.

== See also ==
- Allied health professions
- Bachelor of Clinical Medicine and Community Health
- Clinical officers
- Health care providers
- Health extension officers
