= Kenya Methodist University =

University in Kenya

- Motto: 'The Future is Here'
- Type: Private
- Established: 2006
- Chancellor: Rev. Stephen Kanyaru M'impwii
- Vice-Chancellor: Rev. Prof. John Kobia Ataya, PhD.
- Location: Kenya
- Website: www.kemu.ac.ke

The Kenya Methodist University (KeMU) is a chartered private university founded by the Methodist Church in Kenya. It is situated within woodland on the north eastern slopes of Mount Kenya, five kilometers from Meru Town. The development of KeMU is based on the 1906 Methodist Church education policy that resulted in the development of schools, industrial institutes and colleges.

== History ==
In 1987 the Methodist Church in Kenya formed a working committee to work out how to establish a university in the region. In 1995 the Commission for Higher Education made an inspection visit of the project, and later in June 1997 granted a Letter of Interim Authority, giving approval for the establishment of Kenya Methodist University. The authority paved the way for the creation of academic programmes, research and post-graduate training. KeMU became a fully chartered university on 28 June 2006.

== Campus ==
The university has campuses in Meru, Nairobi, and Mombasa .
