= Certified anesthesiologist assistant =

Certified anesthesiologist assistants (CAAs) are master’s degree level non-physician anesthesia care providers in North America. CAAs are members of the anesthesia care team as described by the American Society of Anesthesiologists (ASA). This designation must be disambiguated from the Certified Clinical Anesthesia Assistant (CCAA) designation conferred by the Canadian Society of Respiratory Therapists. All CAAs possess a baccalaureate degree, and complete an intensive didactic and clinical program at a postgraduate level. CAAs are trained in the delivery and maintenance of most types of anesthesia care as well as advanced patient monitoring techniques. The goal of CAA education is to guide the transformation of student applicants into competent clinicians.

== General description ==
Prior to acceptance into their respective graduate programs all anesthesiologist assistant students must possess an undergraduate degree. The anesthesiologist assistant works under the medical direction of a physician anesthesiologist as a part of the anesthesia care team. Anesthesiologist assistants administer all forms of anesthetic medications, IV fluids and blood products.

Anesthesiologist assistants generally work in the hospital setting but can work at any location (with the presence/direction of a physician anesthesiologist) such as pain clinics, dental offices, and outpatient surgical centers. Anesthesiologist assistants work in most facets of surgical environments such as endoscopy, conscious sedation, abdominal surgery, orthopedic surgery, as well as cardiac surgery, neurosurgery, transplant surgery, and trauma surgery centers. Currently Certified Anesthesiologist Assistants are able to practice in twenty two states, the District of Columbia, and Guam. In each of these states, the anesthesiologist assistant falls under the regulatory authority and licensing of the State Board of Medicine.

== History of the profession ==
In the 1960s, three anesthesiologists, Joachim S. Gravenstein, John E. Steinhaus, and Perry P. Volpitto, were concerned with the shortage of anesthesiologists in the country. These academic department chairs analyzed the spectrum of tasks required during anesthesia care. The tasks were individually evaluated based on the level of professional responsibility, required education and necessary technical skill. The result of this anesthesia workforce analysis was to introduce the concept of team care and to define a new type of anesthesia provider called a mid-level anesthesia practitioner linked to a supervising anesthesiologist. This new professional - the Anesthesiologist Assistant or AA - was an answer to help alleviate this shortage

The chairmen's vision became reality in 1969 when the first AA training programs began accepting students at Emory University in Atlanta, Georgia, and at Case Western Reserve University in Cleveland, Ohio.

== Education ==
A master's level education is required to train anesthesiologist assistants to collect patient data, assist in the evaluation of patients’ physical and mental status, document the surgical procedures planned, and administer the therapeutic plan for patient care that has been formulated by the anesthesiologist. There are twenty one programs available for the Anesthesiologist Assistant master's degree in the United States. All programs are accredited by the Commission on Accreditation of Allied Health Education (CAAHEP).

- Bluefield University at VCOM-Auburn in Auburn, AL (Est. 2021)
- Case Western Reserve University in Cleveland, Ohio (Est. 1970)
- Case Western Reserve University in Houston, Texas (Est. 2010)
- Case Western Reserve University in Austin, Texas (Est. 2023)
- Case Western Reserve University in Washington, District of Columbia (Est. 2012)
- Emory University in Atlanta, Georgia (Est. 1969)
- Indiana University School of Medicine in Indianapolis, Indiana (Est. 2017)
- Medical College of Wisconsin in Milwaukee, Wisconsin (Est. 2016)
- Northeast Ohio Medical University in Rootstown, Ohio (Est. 2022)
- Nova Southeastern University in Fort Lauderdale, Florida (Est. 2005)
- Nova Southeastern University in Tampa, Florida (Est. 2009)
- Nova Southeastern University in Jacksonville, Florida (Est. 2019)
- Nova Southeastern University in Centennial, Colorado (Est. 2023)
- Ohio Dominican University in Columbus, Ohio (Est. 2022)
- South University in Orlando, Florida (Est. 2021)
- South University in Savannah, Georgia (Est. 2004)
- South University in West Palm Beach, Florida (Est. 2021)
- University of Colorado in Denver, Colorado (Est. 2013)
- University of Missouri–Kansas City in Kansas City, Missouri (Est. 2008)
- University of New Mexico in Albuquerque, New Mexico (Est. 2023)

To enroll in an AA program, candidates require a bachelor's degree in any field, have to obtain a minimum of eight hours of documented anesthesia exposure by observation in the operating room. All programs require an entrance exam (either GRE or MCAT, MCAT preferred).

Program lengths range from 24 to 28 months with didactic and clinical instruction. Didactic training includes courses such as physiology, pharmacology, airway management, simulation laboratory, Basic Life Support (BLS) certification, Pediatric Advanced Life Support (PALS) certification, Advanced Cardiac Life Support (ACLS) certification, anatomy, monitoring, and applied principles and practices. In addition to class work, programs include 2000 to 2700 clinical hours per student. Students gain preoperative, intra-operative and post-operative experience with a variety of patients in a variety of surgical settings. In addition, each program may have additional educational experiences; for example, Nova Southeastern University provides students with courses on scientific research and publishing. All programs must have at least one board-certified, licensed anesthesiologist serving as a director. Additionally, each AA program must be based at, or in collaboration with, a university that has a medical school.

== Certification ==
Graduates from an accredited educational program are eligible to take the initial certifying examination and can do so up to 6 months before graduating from the program. The certifying examination for anesthesiologist assistants is a written exam administered by the National Board of Medical Examiners (NBME), which is contracted by the National Commission for Certification of Anesthesiologist Assistants (NCCAA). Once successfully completed, the NCCAA will award a time-limited certificate to each candidate. In order to maintain certification, anesthesiologist assistants need to register for 40 hours of Continuing Medical Education (CME) every two years and successfully complete a Continued Demonstration of Qualifications (CDQ) examination every six years.

== Scope of practice ==
Anesthesiologist assistants are mid-level providers who work under the direction of licensed physician anesthesiologists as integral members of the Anesthesia Care Team (ACT) . The following list is obtained from the American Academy of Anesthesiologist Assistants (AAAA), which states anesthesiologist assistant responsibilities may include but are not limited to:

- Obtain an appropriate and accurate pre-anesthetic health history; perform an appropriate physical examination and record pertinent data in an organized and legible manner.
- Conduct diagnostic laboratory and related studies as appropriate, such as drawing arterial and venous blood samples.
- Establish non-invasive and invasive routine monitoring modalities.
- Apply and interpret advanced monitoring techniques, such as pulmonary artery catheterization and electroencephalographic spectral analysis (BIS).
- Evaluate and treat life-threatening situations, such as cardiopulmonary resuscitation, on the basis of established protocols (BLS, ACLS, and PALS).
- Delegate administrative duties in an anesthesiology practice or anesthesiology department in such functions as the management of personnel, supplies, and devices.
- Participate in the clinical instruction of CAA students.
- Perform and monitor regional anesthesia (under direct physician supervision) to include, but not limited to, spinal, epidural, IV regional, and other special techniques such as local infiltration and nerve blocks.

The AA scope of practice may differ slightly in relation to local practice and is always defined by the medically directing anesthesiologist, the hospital's clinical protocol procedures, the state's board of medicine, and state regulations.

== Employment ==
The American Medical Association (AMA) states that "AAs are most commonly employed in larger facilities that perform procedures such as cardiac surgery, neurosurgery, transplant surgery, and trauma care." Studies by the AMA found entry-level salaries for 2006 Anesthesiologist Assistant graduates to be between $120,000 and $150,000 for the 40-hour work week plus benefits and consideration of on-call activity. They also found the high end of the salary range to be around $190,000 to $220,000 for experienced anesthesiologist assistants. Salaries vary by region and individual employer.

Anesthesiologist assistants are currently able to work in twenty-three states plus the District of Columbia and the territory of Guam either by licensure or through physician delegation. AAs are recognized by the federal government and are authorized to work at all Veteran Affairs hospitals using the TRICARE insurance program.

Licensure defines the practice of AAs and is achieved through state law or by approval of the individual state board of medicine. Physician delegation is achieved through recognition of AAs by the state board of medicine or through statutes included in the state's medical practice act. The board of medicine affords Anesthesiologist's the right to delegate the responsibilities of their realm of practice to qualified individuals. Delegating authority requires that the physician remain ultimately responsible for the patient. In all states, the practice of anesthesiologist assistants is guided by the board of medicine. Any attempt to employ AAs under delegating authority should be made through the individual state's board of medicine.

States and territories where AAs practice through license and certification:

- Alabama
- Colorado
- District of Columbia
- Florida
- Georgia
- Guam
- Indiana
- Kentucky (requires a CAA to be a PA-C first)
- Missouri
- Nevada
- New Mexico
- North Carolina
- Ohio
- Oklahoma
- South Carolina
- Tennessee
- Vermont
- Virginia
- Utah
- Washington
- Wisconsin

States where AAs practice through physician delegation:

- Kansas
- Michigan
- Pennsylvania
- Texas

== In the U.S. federal government ==
Anesthesiologist Assistants are employed at Veteran Affairs (VA) and Department of Defense facilities under the TRICARE health system since Dec 22, 2006.

The Veterans Health Administration Handbook 1123 on Anesthesia Service, includes the profession of anesthesiologist assistant as an allied health professional. Information in regards to required qualifications, coverage criteria, billing, and payment for Medicare services under the TRICARE program for anesthesiologist assistants is published by the Department of Health and Human Services.

AAs are currently classified as GS-0601, General Health Science Series employees, as defined by The Handbook of Occupational Groups and Families from the U.S. Office of Personnel Management.

== See also ==
- Anesthesia
- Anesthesia provision in the US, a brief description of the different anesthesia providers in the US.
- Anaesthesia Associate - anaesthesia provider in the United Kingdom
