= Health care provider =

Paraprofessionals who assist with bedside care

A health care provider is an individual health professional or a health facility organization licensed to provide health care diagnosis and treatment services including medication, surgery and medical devices. Health care providers often receive payments for their services rendered from health insurance providers.

In the United States, the Department of Health and Human Services defines a health care provider as any "person or organization who furnishes, bills, or is paid for health care in the normal course of business."

== Individual providers ==
In the United States, the law defines a healthcare provider as a "doctor of medicine or osteopathy who is authorized to practice medicine or surgery" by the state, or anyone else designated by the United States Secretary of Labor as being able to provide health care services. In general, this is seen to include:

- Physician, a professional who practices medicine
- Advanced practice provider, a trained health worker who has a defined scope of practice
- Allied health professional, a non-physician clinician who delivers health care services
- Health professional, any person involved in the delivery of health care

== Institutional providers ==
- Hospital network, an organization that operates multiple hospitals and clinics offering comprehensive health care services
- Health system, any organization responsible for delivering care to a population
- Medical group, a partnership of physicians who share resources
- Hospital, a health care facility delivering emergency, intensive care, and other health care services for high-needs patients
- Clinic, a health care facility delivering non-emergency health care services in an office setting

== See also ==
- Health care in the United States § Providers
