= The Doctors' Association UK =

British grassroots doctors' campaigning organisation

Doctors' Association UK
- Abbreviation: DAUK
- Formation: January 2018
- Founder: Samantha Batt-Rawden
- Type: Professional association and campaigning organisation
- Legal status: Private company limited by guarantee
- Purpose: Advocacy for doctors and the NHS
- Headquarters: United Kingdom
- Region served: United Kingdom
- Members: Registered UK doctors and medical students
- Co-Chair: Dr Matt Kneale
- Co-Chair: Ms Helen Fernandes
- Website: dauk.org

The Doctors' Association UK (DAUK) is a grassroots professional association and campaigning organisation for doctors and medical students in the United Kingdom. It was founded in January 2018 in response to the Hadiza Bawa-Garba case and the actions of the General Medical Council (GMC), and has since become a prominent voice on patient safety, medical regulation and working conditions in the NHS.

DAUK is structured as a company limited by guarantee and operates as a non-profit run by volunteer frontline doctors. The organisation came to wider public prominence during the COVID-19 pandemic, when it campaigned over shortages of personal protective equipment (PPE) and over the treatment of migrant healthcare workers. More recently the association has campaigned against the GMC regulation of physician associates and anaesthesia associates, on the funding of NHS Practitioner Health, and on reform of doctor regulation by the GMC.

== History ==
=== Formation and the Bawa-Garba case (2018) ===
DAUK was established in January 2018 by a group of resident doctors led by Samantha Batt-Rawden, in response to the High Court's decision in the case of Hadiza Bawa-Garba, a paediatric trainee who was convicted of gross negligence manslaughter and subsequently struck off the medical register at the GMC's instigation despite a contrary decision by an independent tribunal.

In February 2018, the association wrote to GMC Chief Executive Charlie Massey criticising the regulator's conduct in the case, in a letter signed by more than 4,500 doctors. Bawa-Garba's appeal against erasure was successful in August 2018, with DAUK providing media commentary and supporting the principle of a "just culture" in healthcare. Following the appeal, DAUK called for an inquiry into the GMC's actions, which was backed by Philippa Whitford MP and over 1,200 doctors. The House of Commons Health and Social Care Select Committee subsequently held an inquiry into patient safety and gross negligence manslaughter, to which DAUK submitted written evidence.

=== Learn Not Blame campaign ===
DAUK formally launched its Learn Not Blame campaign at the House of Commons in November 2018, with the then Health Secretary Matt Hancock in attendance. The campaign advocates for a culture in which adverse events are used as opportunities for systemic learning rather than for individual blame. The neurologist Jenny Vaughan, a founding member of DAUK and its Learn Not Blame lead, was a leading figure in the campaign and was appointed OBE in the 2023 New Year Honours for her work on miscarriages of justice in healthcare. Vaughan died of metastatic breast cancer in March 2024; obituaries appeared in The Guardian, The BMJ and on BBC Radio 4's Last Word. DAUK held an inaugural memorial conference at the Wellcome Collection in May 2025.

=== COVID-19 pandemic ===
DAUK was an early and prominent critic of the UK government's preparedness for COVID-19. In early March 2020, a DAUK survey of 1,618 doctors found that only eight respondents felt the NHS was ready for a pandemic; the government's Coronavirus Action Plan was published the following day. The Evening Standard credited DAUK as the first organisation to publicly raise the alarm over NHS preparedness.

The association ran a sustained Protect the Frontline campaign highlighting personal protective equipment (PPE) shortages, coordinating an open letter signed by 3,963 NHS staff published on the front page of The Sunday Times on 22 March 2020, launching an NHS PPE reporting app live on Sky News in April 2020, and, alongside the Good Law Project, filing for judicial review over PPE shortages and healthcare worker deaths. Surveys conducted by the association reported that almost half of doctors had been instructed not to raise concerns about COVID-19 publicly, with around a third reporting bullying when they did so.

DAUK also campaigned successfully for the scrapping of the Immigration health surcharge for international medical graduates (IMGs) and their dependants, an outcome the Guardian described as a government u-turn directly attributable to DAUK's lobbying and a parliamentary intervention by Keir Starmer. The association called for indefinite leave to remain to be extended to IMGs who had served during the pandemic and continued to lobby on death-in-service benefits for healthcare workers.

== Campaigns ==
=== Doctor regulation reform ===
DAUK has continued to campaign for reform of the GMC, in particular for the repeal of section 40A of the Medical Act 1983, which gives the GMC power to appeal decisions of the Medical Practitioners Tribunal Service (MPTS) to the High Court. The 2018 Williams Review into gross negligence manslaughter in healthcare, established in the wake of the Bawa-Garba case, recommended removal of this power, but as of 2025 it remained in place. In April 2021, DAUK joined twelve other healthcare organisations — including the BMA, the Royal College of Physicians and the Royal College of General Practitioners — in a joint letter to the Health Secretary urging that section 40A be removed in the forthcoming Health and Social Care Bill.

In 2026, DAUK is consulting on the UK Government's draft General Medical Council Order 2026, which would constitute the most substantial reform of medical regulation since the Medical Act 1983.

=== Physician associates and anaesthesia associates ===
From 2023, DAUK became a leading critic of the regulation of physician associates (PAs) and anaesthesia associates (AAs) by the GMC under the Anaesthesia Associates and Physician Associates Order 2024. In October 2023, an open letter to the GMC organised by DAUK Co-Chairs Matt Kneale and Helen Fernandes was signed by more than 2,800 doctors, describing the proposed regulation as "unsafe, premature, and lacking the necessary safeguards". A further letter to The Times in September 2024, signed by more than 30 senior doctors, stated that "Parliament was misled with statements implying widespread support from the medical profession" when the order was debated.

In 2024, DAUK contributed £30,000 to the crowdfunding effort of Anaesthetists United, which brought a judicial review in the High Court challenging the GMC's regulation of PAs and AAs. The challenge was supported by Marion and Brendan Chesterton, the parents of Emily Chesterton, who died aged 30 after being seen by a physician associate she believed to be a GP. The case proceeded to a full High Court hearing before Mrs Justice Lambert, with judgment handed down on 5 September 2025. A parallel BMA challenge over the GMC's use of the term "medical professionals" was dismissed in April 2025.

In November 2024, Health Secretary Wes Streeting commissioned the Leng Review, an independent review of PA and AA roles led by Professor Gillian Leng — following sustained pressure from DAUK and others. DAUK submitted detailed evidence to the review. The review's final report, published in July 2025, recommended that physician associates be renamed "physician assistants" to reduce patient confusion. DAUK criticised the wider findings as resting on a "weak evidence base", and continued to call for PA and AA regulation to be transferred away from the GMC.

=== International medical graduates ===
Building on its Immigration health surcharge campaign during the COVID-19 pandemic, DAUK has continued to lobby for the position of international medical graduates (IMGs) in the NHS. The association has campaigned for reductions in indefinite leave to remain fees for healthcare professionals, against delays to Certificates of Sponsorship and Biometric Residence Permits, and for IMG prioritisation in the response to the medical training competition crisis.

=== Doctor wellbeing and Practitioner Health ===
In April 2024, NHS England announced that funding for NHS Practitioner Health — a confidential mental health and addiction service for doctors and dentists — would be withdrawn for secondary care doctors with only days' notice. DAUK Co-Chair Helen Fernandes described the decision as "absolutely outrageous", and DAUK ran a social media campaign that was widely reported in the medical press. NHS England reversed the decision within a week, and the service's funding was subsequently extended through to 2029.

The association has also campaigned on what it characterises as disproportionate GMC fees for doctors taking maternity, shared parental and adoption leave, arguing that the current arrangements may be "indirectly discriminatory" under the Equality Act 2010.

=== Resident doctors and workforce policy ===
DAUK has commented on the resident doctors' pay dispute in England, although the principal trade union representing those doctors is the British Medical Association. In 2025–26, DAUK responded to reports in the Health Service Journal that NHS England Chief Executive Sir Jim Mackey intended to accelerate clinical models less reliant on doctors in response to industrial action, arguing that workforce substitution was being used as a strategic response to strikes rather than an evidence-based patient safety measure.

== Organisation ==
DAUK is structured as a company limited by guarantee, with a volunteer executive committee elected at its annual general meeting. As of 2026, there are two Co-Chairs — Helen Fernandes, a consultant neurosurgeon at Addenbrooke's Hospital, and Matt Kneale, an emergency medicine doctor and member of the British Medical Association Professional Regulation Committee.

== See also ==
- Hadiza Bawa-Garba case
- Physician assistant (United Kingdom)
- General Medical Council
- British Medical Association
