= Anaesthetists United =

Advocacy group of UK anaesthetists

Anaesthetists United is a medico-political advocacy group in the United Kingdom co-founded by Ramey Assaf and Richard Marks in June 2023 to campaign against the proposed expansion of physician assistants in anaesthesia (PAAs, then referred to as anaesthesia associates or AAs), as proposed by the NHS Long Term Workforce Plan. The group, composed of around 20 anaesthetists, undertook work to draft motions and submitted a requisition to the Royal College of Anaesthetists (RCoA) for an Extraordinary General Meeting (EGM) which took place on 17 October 2023. It successfully campaigned on issues relating to the training of anaesthetists.

Anaesthetists United is an incorporated limited company as of the 1st of July 2024, with 2 company directors.

== Campaign issues ==
The main objective of Anaesthetists United was to requisition an EGM of the RCoA, with three main issues relating to anaesthesia in the UK to be discussed: anaesthesia associates, rotational training and national recruitment to specialty training. Six resolutions were proposed by members:

1. A pause in the proposed expansion of anaesthesia associates, proposed by Dr Danny Wong
2. Supervision of anaesthesia associates, proposed, proposed by Dr Danny Wong
3. Information for Patients, proposed by Dr Jan Hansel
4. Rotational training, proposed by Dr Ramey Assaf
5. National recruitment for doctors-in-training, proposed by Dr Richard Marks
6. Regional recruitment, proposed by Dr Richard Marks

=== Physician assistants in anaesthesia ===
Physician assistants in anaesthesia (known prior to July 2025 as anaesthesia associates) were introduced to the UK in 2004 as non-medically trained practitioners that administer anaesthetics. Similar to Physician assistants, they have been regulated by the General Medical Council since December 2024, as per the Anaesthesia Associate and Physician Associate Order 2024. Their training consists of a two-year postgraduate course, leading to the award of a Master's degree. To be eligible to apply, they must have a previous degree in a science subject, or recognised previous healthcare experience. As of July 2023, there were 164 AAs registered on their managed voluntary register.

Their scope of practice was last agreed by the Association of Anaesthetists and the RCoA in 2016, and excluded areas such as regional anaesthesia, obstetric anaesthesia and paediatric anaesthesia. However, individual employers were able to implement arrangements where scope of practice was expanded, with local clinical governance to maintain patient safety.

The original title for the role was Anaesthesia Practitioner; this was changed to Physicians' Assistant (Anaesthesia), as anaesthetic nurses and Operating Department Practitioners often used anaesthesia practitioner as a generic title. The name changed from Physician Associates (Anaesthesia) PA(A)s to Anaesthesia Associates (AAs) to align with other roles such as Physician Associates and Nursing Associates. Following the Leng Review in July 2025, the title changed again to physician assistant in anaesthesia (PAA).

The latest curriculum for physician assistants in anaesthesia was publicly consulted upon and published in 2023 by the Royal College of Anaesthetists. It remained in draft until statutory regulation began for Anaesthesia Associates by the General Medical Council, in December 2024.

=== Training and Regional Recruitment ===
Recruitment into the specialty of anaesthesia in the UK has been conducted nationally for the past 15 years, with the Anaesthetics National Recruitment Office (ANRO) in charge of the operational aspects of recruitment. In 2021, Health Education England (now merged into NHS England) launched a review into the autumn 2021 recruitment round for core and higher specialty trainees due to a large number of mistakes in scoring identified through separate complaints from applicants. The review team concluded that a series of systems failures had occurred, including incorrect use of the VLOOKUP Excel function by members of staff. Since then, ANRO has been under investigation by the UK Department of Business and Trade over workers' rights. Anaesthetists United proposed a vote of no confidence in ANRO by the RCoA, for the College to explore the option of regional rather than national recruitment, and a call to minimise rotational training due to its detrimental impact on trainees' quality of life.

=== Campaign conduct ===
Anaesthetists United employed promotional images generated using artificial intelligence algorithms such as Midjourney to run a campaign on social media platforms such as X and Reddit with a limited budget, with members volunteering their time to the effort. A six-fingered man in purple scrubs became the hallmark of the social media campaign. A video montage of Anaesthesia Associates talking at an event organised by Lancaster University highlighting work beyond the expected scope of practice and potential misrepresentation garnered much attention on social media.

An online survey was used to collect signatures from members through a campaign on social media. On 31 August 2023 more than 700 signatures were collected and delivered to the RCoA, following which the EGM was announced.

== Extraordinary General Meeting ==
On 17 October 2023 the Extraordinary General Meeting of the RCoA was convened. Up to 1,500 members attended the virtual event live, and more than 4,900 members voted.

Outcome of the EGM - Final audited number of votes for each resolution
| Resolution | Votes for | Votes against | Abstained | Result |
|---|---|---|---|---|
| Resolution on the proposed expansion of anaesthesia associates | 4,421 (88.94%) | 550 (11.06%) | 103 | Carried |
| Resolution on the supervision of anaesthesia associates | 4,665 (93.06%) | 348 (6.94%) | 105 | Carried |
| Resolution on information for patients | 4,813 (96.39%) | 180 (3.61%) | 115 | Carried |
| Resolution on rotational training | 4,347 (91.88%) | 384 (8.12%) | 326 | Carried |
| Resolution on national recruitment for doctors in training | 4,506 (98.02%) | 91 (1.98%) | 376 | Carried |
| Resolution on regional recruitment | 3,929 (88.73%) | 499 (11.27%) | 517 | Carried |

The full recording of the event is available on the RCoA website.

== Media coverage ==
Throughout the campaign, Anaesthetists United and the proposed EGM has attracted national media coverage. This interest coincided with the proposed national expansion of the Medical Associate Practitioner workforce outlined in the NHS Long Term Workforce Plan and emerging accounts of patient harm associated with unsupervised practice. One such case, the death of 30-year-old Emily Chesterton, was discussed in the House of Commons on 6 July 2023.

== Impact and legacy ==
Building on the success of Anaesthetists United, other medical professional groups in the UK, including general practitioners, radiologists, ophthalmologists and psychiatrists, have launched their own iterations of similar advocacy campaigns.

Following the success of the RCoA EGM Anaesthetists United announced it would stop its activities on 18 October 2023. The RCoA committed itself to addressing the views of the membership.

A 2024 economic analysis published in the BJA argued that for AAs to be economically viable, a salary of less than 50% of their medically qualified supervisors would be required; they note that AA salaries exceed this. The authors further argue that AAs, as currently implemented, are not economically viable, and that to achieve economic viability, they would either need to be paid less, have their autonomy increased, or "the AA programme should be terminated". The author in this article based the supervisors salary on SAS doctors, when in practice the supervision is provided by consultants. Consultant salaries in the NHS start at £99,532 rising to £131,964. A newly qualified AA would often start at band 7 starting at £43,742 up to a maximum on top of band 8a £57,349. The more accurate supervisor salary changes the conclusion of the article as the salary range of an AA remains 50% or lower than that of their consultant supervisors.
