= JAAPA =

- Discipline: Healthcare
- Language: English
- Edited by: Richard Dehn

Publication details
- Former name: Journal of the American Academy of Physician Assistants
- History: 1988-present
- Publisher: Wolters Kluwer on behalf of the American Academy of Physician Associates (United States)
- Frequency: Monthly

Standard abbreviations
- ISO 4: JAAPA

Indexing
- ISSN: 1547-1896 (print); 0893-7400 (web)
- OCLC no.: 32935348

Links
- Journal homepage; Online archive

JAAPA: Journal of the American Academy of Physician Associates is a peer-reviewed medical journal published by Wolters Kluwer on behalf of the American Academy of Physician Associates. Its mission is to support the ongoing education and advancement of physician assistants by publishing current information and research on clinical, health policy, and professional issues. The journal is abstracted and indexed by MEDLINE/PubMed.
