= Medical associate profession =

In the United Kingdom, the medical associate professions are three novel professional groups of mid-level practitioners in the National Health Service who are not qualified in medicine, but who have specific education, training and team frameworks allowing them to deliver some aspects of healthcare that were traditionally restricted to medical doctors. The three roles are:

- Physician assistant
- Physician assistant in anaesthesia
- Surgical care practitioner

A fourth professional group, advanced critical care practitioners, were formerly classed under the scope of the medical associate professions, but voted to withdraw from this in April 2022.

Since 2016, a MAP Oversight Board exists within Health Education England.
