= Gillian Leng =

British physician, administrator and academic

Gillian Leng, Lady Cosford CBE
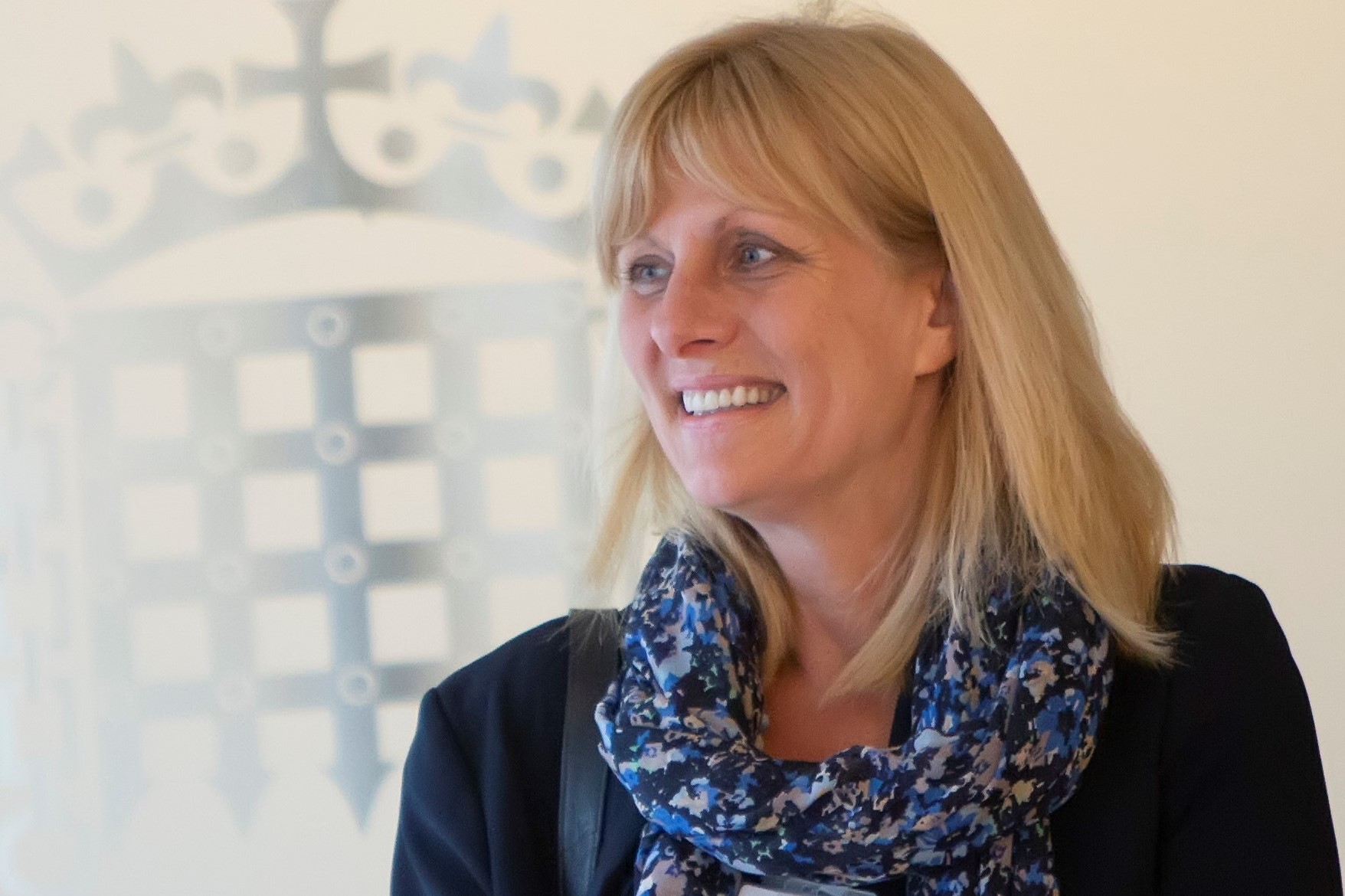
- Born: Gillian Catherine Leng
- Education: University of Leeds
- Known for: Former Chief Executive, National Institute for Health and Care Excellence (NICE); President of the Royal Society of Medicine (2024)
- Relatives: Sir Paul Cosford (spouse)
- Medical career
- Profession: Physician
- Field: Public health
- Institutions: National Institute for Health and Care Excellence; King's College London; University of Leeds; National University of Singapore; Royal Society of Medicine

Gillian Catherine Leng, Lady Cosford CBE is a British health administrator, academic, visiting professor at King's College London and the former chief executive of the National Institute for Health and Care Excellence (NICE), where she was responsible for several programmes and guidelines including the guidelines on COVID-19. In 2024 she became president of the Royal Society of Medicine (RSM).

She has been involved in the Cochrane collaboration since its foundation, and has worked on clinical trials and epidemiological research in public health medicine. She also teaches at the NUS Saw Swee Hock School of Public Health.

== Education ==
Gillian Leng gained her medical degree from the University of Leeds in 1987, having previously gained a degree in physiology. She completed her house jobs at St James's University Hospital and subsequently moved to Scotland to work as a senior house officer in cancer care and in accident and emergency. She received her MD in 1994.

== Career ==
Leng has been involved in the Cochrane collaboration since its foundation. She worked on clinical trials and epidemiological research in Edinburgh, and in London as a consultant in public health medicine.

Leng participated as a keynote speaker at the 2015 International Festival of Public Health. She was also speaker at the World Neuroscience Innovation Forum in 2017, where she discussed gene therapy and cell therapy in treating neurological diseases. She then spoke at the ISPOR Summit 2018.

Leng delivered a presentation for the European Society of Cardiology at an event titled Digital Health 2019.

She became Deputy Chief Executive at the National Institute for Health and Care Excellence (NICE) in 2007. In April 2020, during the first COVID-19 lockdown, she succeeded Andrew Dillon as the CEO of NICE. There, she oversaw the creation of new guidelines on COVID-19. Previously she was responsible for the initial set up and running of NICE's clinical guidelines programme, for establishing the NICE implementation function, and for setting up NHS Evidence. Her other roles included being responsible for the NICE accreditation programme, guideline development in social care, and the NICE programmes of indicators and quality standards.

She is visiting professor at King's College London, and teaches at NUS Saw Swee Hock School of Public Health. She is a trustee and former chair of the Guidelines International Network. She is also a member of the steering committee of the International Guideline Development Credentialing & Certification Program (INGUIDE).

Leng is a member of the Global Commission on Evidence to Address Societal Challenges. The commission is a partnership spawned out of COVID-END, with leadership from McMaster University and the Ottawa Hospital Research Institute.

In May 2022, Leng was appointed to the advisory board of consulting firm Brevia Health. The RSM appointed her their dean of education in October 2022.

Leng led the Leng Review, an independent review which examined the use of physician associates and anaesthesia associates in the National Health Service. Published in July 2025, it recommended renaming the roles and introducing stricter supervision to improve patient safety.

== Awards and honours ==
Leng was awarded a CBE in the 2011 Birthday Honours. She was appointed honorary librarian at the RSM, London, in 2017. In 2023 she was elected president-elect of the RSM. She became the RSM's 109th president on 23 July 2024.

== Personal and family ==
She married Paul Cosford in 2006. Following his death in 2021, she announced her retirement from NICE; Dr Samantha Roberts succeeded her on 1 February 2022.

== Selected publications ==
=== Articles ===
- Leng, GC; Fowkes, FGR (February 1993). "The Epidemiology of Peripheral Arterial Disease". Vascular Medicine Review. vmr-4 (1): 5–18. doi:10.1177/1358863x9300400102. ISSN 0954-2582. S2CID 77748948.
- Cosford, Paul A.; Leng, Gillian C.; Thomas, Justyn (18 April 2007). "Screening for abdominal aortic aneurysm". The Cochrane Database of Systematic Reviews (2) CD002945. doi:10.1002/14651858.CD002945.pub2. ISSN 1469-493X. PMID 17443519.

=== Books ===
- Leng, Gillian; Moore, Val; Abraham, Sasha (2014). Achieving High Quality Care: Practical Experience from NICE. Wiley Blackwell. ISBN 978-1-118-54358-0.
