= Samantha Batt-Rawden =

British doctor

Dr Samantha Batt-Rawden is a British intensive care and pre-hospital doctor.

== Medical career ==
Batt-Rawden trained at the University of Bristol. She chose to specialise in emergency medicine in 2014, but left the speciality citing burnout and staff shortages, in a BBC Radio 4 documentary she presented. She currently works as a consultant in intensive care medicine and pre-hospital emergency medicine.

== Advocacy career ==
Batt-Rawden founded The Doctors' Association UK in 2018, following the premature birth of her son at 27 weeks, who required a 3 month stay in ICU. She says this experience has made her determined to fight for the NHS. She stepped down from the role in 2021.

She was widely quoted by media during the Bawa-Garba case and has given evidence to Parliament on creating a just culture in healthcare.

Batt-Rawden was a doctor on Good Morning Britain from 2018-2021 and prior to this was featured on This Morning.

== Role in the COVID-19 pandemic ==
In February 2020, Batt-Rawden was quoted in The Evening Standard as saying that the NHS was not well-prepared for the pandemic. She later raised concerns about inadequate PPE, a lack of scrubs and poor access to fit testing. Batt-Rawden said that staff were being prevented from speaking up about conditions on the frontline, especially in regards to PPE shortages. Batt-Rawden also campaigned to secure a Death in Service benefit for NHS staff and for the Health Service Surcharge to be scrapped. Her letter to the Home Secretary was read in Parliament by Sir Keir Starmer at Prime Minister's Questions.

She has continued to advocate for NHS staff and their wellbeing during the pandemic, stressing that NHS staff will leave at the end of the pandemic if they are not well looked after now.

In between the first and second coronavirus wave, Batt-Rawden raised concerns in Parliament that lessons not been sufficiently learnt to prevent a resurgence of cases and admissions, in the event of a second wave. She gave evidence to the All-Party Parliamentary Group on Coronavirus in September 2020. Batt-Rawden worked with several Royal Colleges campaigning for NHS staff to be prioritised for the vaccine, raising concern about rising staff sickness rates.

Recently, Batt-Rawden has been tackling abuse of NHS staff both on social media and in person. This prompted her to start the #NHSblueheart campaign.

Since stepping down from the Doctors' Association UK, Batt-Rawden has continued her peer support work, supporting healthcare workers suffering from trauma during the pandemic and has launched a number of wellbeing initiatives. For this work she was one of three finalists for the Doctor of the Year at the Who Cares Wins awards in 2021.

== Research ==
Batt-Rawden's research is in the empathy in medical professionals, PTSD and moral injury on which she has published a number of papers, and has given a TEDx talk. In her TEDx talk, she also discussed the experience that she had with her son whilst he was in intensive care.
