= Physician Assistant National Certifying Exam =

The Physician Assistant National Certifying Exam (PANCE) and Physician Assistant National Recertifying Exam (PANRE) are certification examinations taken by physician assistants (PAs) in the United States. The examinations are administered by the National Commission on Certification of Physician Assistants. The tests are computer-based and consist of practical medical and surgical questions.

== PANCE ==
The PANCE must be taken before a PA can be licensed for the first time upon graduation from an accredited program. The examination consists of 300 multiple-choice questions administered in five 60-minute, 60-question blocks. There is a total of 45 minutes allotted for breaks between blocks, as well as a 15-minute tutorial prior to the examination.

== PANRE ==
The examination consists of 240 multiple-choice questions administered in four 60-minute, 60-question blocks; the breaks and tutorial are timed as on the PANCE. The PANRE can be retaken if failed after a 90-day waiting period between tests, but it can only be taken twice in one year. While 60% of the generalist exam covers the same content, the remaining 40% can be directed towards questions in one of three areas: adult medicine, surgery, or primary care.

As of 2014, PAs who have already been certified are required to take the PANRE during the fifth or sixth year of their six-year certification maintenance cycle. This re-certification time frame is scheduled to change in 2015; re-certification will be required during the ninth or tenth year of the certification maintenance cycle.

== Content areas ==
The material on the PANCE and PANRE is organized by the NCCPA into two dimensions, as indicated in the content blueprint for the examination.

1. "Organ systems and the diseases, disorders and medical assessments physician assistants encounter within those systems; and
2. The knowledge and skills physician assistants should exhibit when confronted with those diseases, disorders and assessments."

== See also ==
- USMLE
