= Jenny Vaughan =

British neurologist (1968–2024)

Jenny Vaughan OBE
- Born: Jennifer Rosemary Vaughan; 25 June 1968; Bristol, England
- Died: 31 March 2024 (aged 55)
- Education: University of Nottingham
- Medical career
- Institutions: Ealing Hospital; Charing Cross Hospital

Jennifer Rosemary Vaughan OBE (25 June 1968 – 31 March 2024) was a British neurologist and co-lead of The Doctors' Association UK. She specialised in movement disorders, with a focus on Parkinson's disease. Alongside her research, Vaughan campaigned to improve justice within healthcare. She was made an Officer of the Order of the British Empire in the 2023 New Year Honours.

== Early life and education ==
Vaughan was born in Bristol on 25 June 1968, and grew up in South West England. Her parents were both teachers. As a young person she was passionate about improving access to clean drinking water. She said that she became interested in a career in medicine after a school trip to Russia. When saving money to attend university, she worked in the kitchen of a mushroom farm. She studied medicine at the University of Nottingham, and specialised in neurology in London. She worked in Imperial College Healthcare NHS Trust and Ealing Hospital.

== Research and career ==
Vaughan worked on movement disorders and the genetic mutations and associated phenotype causing early-onset Parkinson's disease.

Alongside her academic research, Vaughan was committed to ending injustice. She co-led the "Learn Not Blame" campaign, a Doctors' Association UK campaign to end blame culture within the National Health Service. The campaign, which launched in 2018, looked to empower individual doctors to learn from adverse events and promote a fair environment. She has successfully campaigned to reform the law on gross negligence, and chaired the campaign to overturn the conviction of Mr David Sellu FRCS and worked with many others to draw national and international attention to the case of Dr Hadiza Bawa-Garba. She argued that the trials were racially charged, and showed that most doctors in England experiencing medical manslaughter trials were Black or minority ethnic. In an interview with The BMJ, Vaughan described Just Culture as being the single most important change she would like to see in the NHS as " Patient safety should always come first. We need to bring in a truly just culture so that errors are discussed openly and everyone can learn from mistakes.". Her advocacy for doctor safety resulted in delivering an invited lecture tour of Australasia in 2018. In 2022 she delivered a TEDxNHS talk on reconnecting with hope when things go wrong.

During the COVID-19 pandemic Vaughan campaigned to get proper personal protective equipment and legal protection for healthcare staff. She was made an Order of the British Empire in the 2023 New Year Honours.

== Personal life and death ==
Vaughan was a Christian. She had two sons, who attended West London private schools, her younger son Christopher starred in musical theatre. Jenny Vaughan died from cancer on 31 March 2024, at the age of 55.

== Select publications ==
- Lücking CB; Durr, Alexandra; Bonifati V; et al. (2000). "Association between early-onset Parkinson's disease and mutations in the parkin gene". The New England Journal of Medicine. 342 (21): 1560–7. doi:10.1056/nejm200005253422103. PMID 10824074. Wikidata Q29615733.
- N Abbas; C B Lücking; S Ricard; et al. (1999). "A wide variety of mutations in the parkin gene are responsible for autosomal recessive parkinsonism in Europe. French Parkinson's Disease Genetics Study Group and the European Consortium on Genetic Susceptibility in Parkinson's Disease". Human Molecular Genetics. 8 (4): 567–74. doi:10.1093/hmg/8.4.567. PMID 10072423. Wikidata Q28371129.
- Naheed L Khan; Shushant Jain; Lynch, John; et al. (2005). "Mutations in the gene LRRK2 encoding dardarin (PARK8) cause familial Parkinson's disease: clinical, pathological, olfactory and functional imaging and genetic data". Brain. 128 (Pt 12): 2786–2796. doi:10.1093/brain/awh667. PMID 16272164. Wikidata Q33226682.
