= CASPA =

Centralized Application Service for Physician Assistants
- Industry: University and College Admissions
- Founded: 2001
- Headquarters: USA
- Website: https://caspa.liaisoncas.com/

CASPA or the Centralized Application Service for Physician Assistants is an application service for graduate-level PA programs. Similar to the Common Application used by some undergraduate institutions and the American Medical College Application Service used by medical schools, CASPA allows students to submit one application to multiple schools. The CASPA application platform is a service offered by the Physician Assistant Education Association (PAEA).

== History ==
The CASPA application service launched in 2001 with 68 participating physician assistant programs, and mailed over 16,000 applications to its member schools. The original service consisted of the CASPA Applicant Portal, which interfaced with students, and the CASPA Admissions Portal, or PA Admit, an admissions software that interfaced directly with PA schools. Completed applications were printed and mailed to programs via postal mail. In 2011, CASPA moved from the PA AdMIT admissions software to WebADMIT, a web-based admissions application that allows schools to receive and review applications online rather than receiving them by mail. Today, over 180 PA programs use CASPA, which accounts for 90% of ARC-PA accredited physician assistant programs in the United States. CASPA annually processes over 100,000 applications.

In 2015, CASPA moved its Applicant Portal to an entirely new software platform, called CAS 3.0. New aspects of the platform included a visual, image-based user interface as opposed to the previous text-based interface, and all payments and fee waiver submission forms moved to an entirely electronic format. The platform also included the addition of "Program Materials," a section of the application in which PA programs could configure and collect specific documentation and other information for their program directly through the CASPA application.

== Member Programs ==
PA Programs must be accredited by ARC-PA and be a member of PAEA in order to participate in CASPA as full-fledged programs. New PA programs who have applied for, but not yet received accreditation from ARC-PA may participate for one application cycle as a "developing program." All programs which participate in CASPA are graduate-level programs which require that students have completed at least some college-level coursework prior to applying. The small number of bachelor's degree-level PA programs which accept students straight from high school study do not use the CASPA application. Applicants may determine whether or not the programs they are interested in applying to use CASPA by searching the PA Program Directory.

== Features ==
CASPA is open for applicants to apply to PA programs for roughly eleven months each year. Its open period, called an "application cycle," runs annually from mid-April through April 1. To use the application, applicants must register a user account and fill out standard blocks of application material which is sent to all programs to which they apply. Standard application information includes personal information, academic history, work experience, health care certifications, awards and honors received, professional memberships, references, standardized test scores, and a personal essay documenting an applicant's interest in the physician assistant profession. Applicants must also submit official academic transcripts to CASPA and request at least three letters of reference in order to submit their applications to a PA program. All of this information is provided once and accessed by each school to which the applicant chooses to apply.

The PA programs themselves have varying deadlines which occur during each application cycle. Those deadlines also have varying requirements based upon the individual PA program, which the applicants must research and adhere to in order to be considered by the school. PA programs also document their additional requirements on the "Program Materials" section of the CASPA application, where they have the ability to require additional documents to be uploaded, questions to be answered, and/or prerequisite courses to be marked as completed in order for an applicant to submit their application to that program specifically. Applying to PA programs via CASPA costs $177 for an application to be submitted to one school, and an additional $51 for each subsequent school. In addition, some PA programs charge supplemental application fees or require applicants to submit supplemental documentation.
