= Paul Cosford =

Public health director (1963–2021)

Sir Paul Cosford KCB
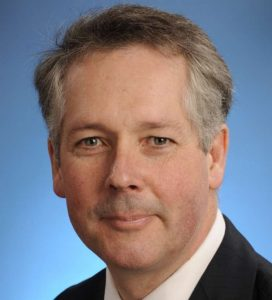
- Born: 20 May 1963; Thornbury, Gloucestershire, England
- Died: 5 April 2021 (aged 57)
- Education: Exeter School; St Mary's Hospital Medical School
- Occupations: Regional Director of Public Health, East of England (2006–2010); Executive Director, HPA (2010–2013); Medical Director and Director for Health Protection PHE (2013–2019)
- Years active: 1987–2021
- Known for: UK public health response to: Ebola outbreak (2014); Salisbury and Amesbury poisonings (2018)
- Relatives: Gillian Leng (wife)
- Medical career
- Profession: Physician
- Field: Public health
- Institutions: St Mary's Hospital Medical School; Health Protection Agency; Public Health England

Sir Paul Anthony Cosford KCB (20 May 1963 – 5 April 2021) was a British emeritus medical director at Public Health England (PHE), the UK's public health agency, later replaced by the UK Health Security Agency. He had executive roles from 2010 at PHE's predecessor, the Health Protection Agency. From April 2013 to 2019 he was PHE's Medical Director and Director for Health Protection, making him responsible for advising on services to prevent and control infectious diseases and for preparations and responses to public health emergencies. He led the MMR vaccine catch-up campaign in response to the resurgence of measles following the MMR Scare, and contributed to the response to the 2014 Ebola outbreak, the Grenfell disaster in 2017, and the 2018 Novichok poisonings in Salisbury and Amesbury. Over the course of his career in public health he led programmes to reduce hospital-acquired infections and tuberculosis, and oversaw ways of dealing with health inequalities, tobacco, obesity, and responses to pandemic flu.

Earlier in his career Cosford moved to North West London to train in psychiatry and in 1990 was appointed lecturer in psychiatry at St Mary's Hospital Medical School. He worked with people with learning difficulties and severe mental illness, and wrote on eating disorders in the elderly. He then transferred to public health and held posts in Hertfordshire and Bedfordshire, and later became director of public health with the Leicestershire, Northamptonshire, and Rutland Area Health Authority. In 2006, the year before he co-authored his Cochrane review on screening for abdominal aortic aneurysms (AAA), he was appointed Regional Director of Public Health for the East of England, which he served until 2010.

In 2017 Cosford was diagnosed with advanced lung cancer, which obliged him to step down from his role as director for PHE in 2019. That year, he was lead author of a paper discussing lung cancer in people who had, like himself, never smoked. He subsequently wrote an essay, in which he called for policies on assisted dying to be reviewed. In 2020, in his emeritus role, he reported frequently on the COVID-19 pandemic and continued to work while self-isolating during the early COVID-19 lockdowns.

For his services to public health, Cosford was appointed CB in 2016 and KCB in 2021.

== Early life and education ==
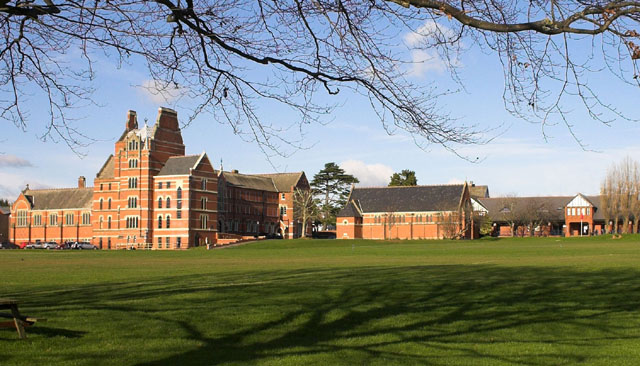
Exeter School, where Cosford was head boy

Paul Cosford was born in Thornbury, Gloucestershire, on 20 May 1963, one of three children born to teachers Brian and Judith Cosford. Following a move to Exmouth, he entered Exeter School in 1974, and became deputy head boy and captain of tennis there. He completed his secondary education in 1981 and gained admission to study medicine at St Mary's Hospital Medical School, (Note: Later merged with Imperial College School of Medicine.) London, where he also participated in rowing. After graduating with at first a bachelor's degree and then a medical degree in 1987, he moved back to Devon.

== Early career ==
Initially, Cosford had planned a career in general practice, but following the loss of a child to a genetic disorder, he moved to north west London to take up psychiatry and worked with people with learning difficulties and severe mental illness. In 1990, he became lecturer in psychiatry at St Mary's. In 1992, he co-authored a paper titled "Eating disorders in later life: A review", which was published in the International Journal of Geriatric Psychiatry. It reported that not all anorexics were young, that the desire to be thin and happy with one's body did not lessen as women aged, and that eating disorders in older women could appear as a new problem, or recurrence or persistence of an earlier problem. It often occurred in association with severe depression or obsessive compulsive disorder, and the most common trigger for developing an eating disorder later in life, he noted, was the death of a spouse or a loved-one. He is noted to have membership of the Royal College of Psychiatrists.

== Local and regional public health ==
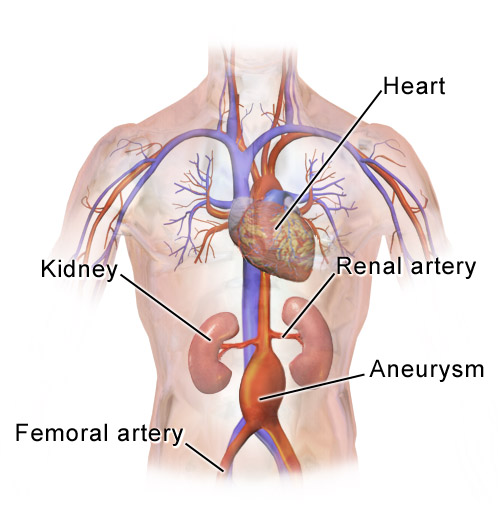
Abdominal Aortic Aneurysm Location

Cosford began his career in public health in the early 1990s, taking on various management roles in the NHS, public health and social care systems. His early posts were in Hertfordshire and Bedfordshire, and later he became director of public health with the Leicestershire, Northamptonshire, and Rutland Area Health Authority.

In 2006 Cosford was one of nine of the new Regional Directors of Public Health introduced by Chief Medical Officer Liam Donaldson, following the announcement of the reorganisation of the NHS. Designated to the East of England, he served as Medical Director of the East of England Strategic Health Authority and Regional Director of Public Health for the East of England in the Department of Health until 2010. He also established the NHS Sustainable Development Unit to reduce the NHS's carbon footprint, and oversaw ways of dealing with health inequalities, tobacco and obesity, responses to pandemic flu, and reducing hospital acquired infections.

In 2007, Cosford coauthored a Cochrane review that established that men, particularly those over the age of 65 years, were more likely than women to develop an abdominal aortic aneurysm (AAA), and to prevent it rupturing and causing death, it was necessary to diagnose it early and arrange elective surgical repair of aneurysms larger than 5.5 cm. He reported that once ruptured, 80% died before reaching a hospital, and only half of those who received emergency surgery survived, but by repairing them early deaths were reduced. The four trials in his review formed the basis of introducing one-time screening for AAA recommended by the U.S. Preventive Services Task Force. A systematic review by the Norwegian Institute of Public Health in 2014 described Cosford's review as of "high quality" and included it in their report as it was at the time the only review that included women and looked at the incidence of AAAs that burst.

At the launch of 'Improving Lives, Saving Lives' in 2007, Cosford said that obesity needed to be addressed as a priority and that intervening was necessary as early as when breastfeeding and weaning took place. Over the subsequent years he reported on high levels of obesity in the east of England. From 2010 he had executive roles at PHE's predecessor, the Health Protection Agency, and was its acting chief executive from October 2012 to February 2013.

== Public Health England ==
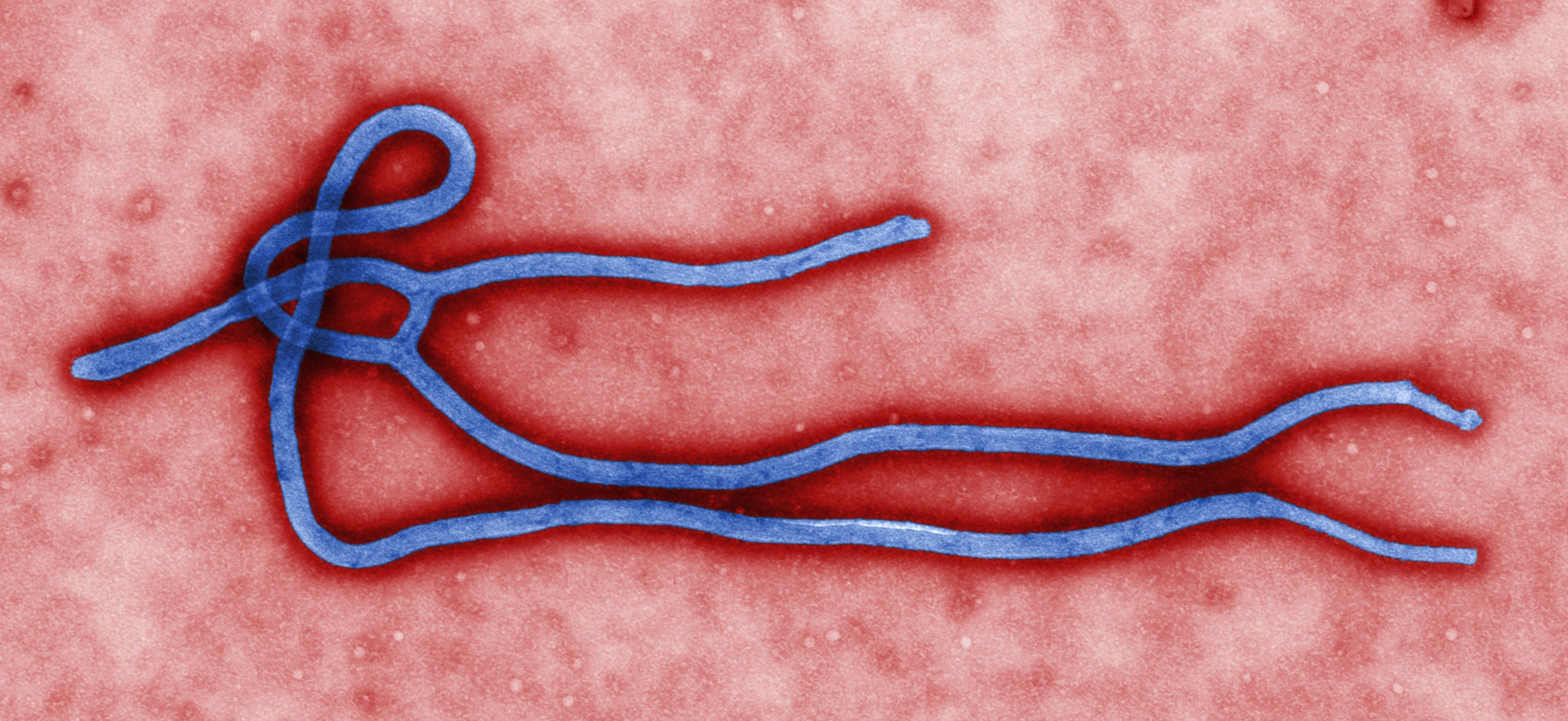
Ebola virus virion

Cosford joined PHE in October 2012, and was appointed its Medical Director and Director for Health Protection, serving PHE in this position from April 2013 to 2019. (Note: The Health Protection Agency became part of PHE in April 2013. PHE had been in a transition phase between October 2012 and its official establishment in April 2013.) His role at PHE meant that he was responsible for advising on services to prevent and control infectious diseases and for preparations and responses to public health emergencies. Following the first nine months of PHE, he told the Health Committee that it had responded to around 4,500 incidents. Subsequently, his career spanned the responses to ten new disease organisms, including Zika, Mers, monkeypox, and ebola.

When rates of measles rose in the UK following the publication of the fraudulent research paper on the MMR vaccine and consequent MMR Scare in the late 1990s, Cosford described it as "galling" that the disease should return. The effect of the misinformation on vaccines resulted in a drop in uptake of the MMR. In 2000, PHE reported 2,000 cases of measles in England and 587 cases were reported in the first three months of 2013. As director for health protection at PHE in 2013, Cosford oversaw the MMR catch-up programme, a plan to identify and vaccinate unvaccinated and partially vaccinated 10 to 16 year olds.

According to an interview with Cosford later in 2017, his biggest challenge until that time had been responding to the Ebola outbreak in the UK and Western African Ebola epidemic. Although the detection of large numbers of cases were not expected, entry-screening at airports was introduced both to advise travellers and to give some reassurance for the UK public, explained in his paper "Advantages of airport screening for Ebola". He discussed such screenings with the European Centre for Disease Prevention and Control in 2014, when representing the UK, he was appointed its new member. He advised on the welfare of PHE staff in Sierre Leone and for those returning to England.

In 2014 Cosford contributed to the response to emergencies, including the contaminated intravenous baby feeds on maternity wards. In the same year he announced the introduction of a toolkit to reduce hospital-acquired infections and reduce spread of antibiotic resistant bacteria. In 2015 he introduced the TB strategy. That year he encouraged British supermarkets to move daffodils away from fruit and vegetable areas because some people were mistaking them for vegetables. The bulbs could appear to some as onions, and the leaves and stems as a type of vegetable popular in China. 63 cases of poisonings had been reported over the previous six years. He led responses to the Zika virus in 2016, and in 2017 he was involved in the response to the Grenfell disaster, measuring pollution levels from the fire and the clean-up operation. He also wrote on the needs of refugees. In 2018, he became involved in debates on the roles and responsibilities of the alcohol industry, and whether the scientific community ought to work with them.

A key government adviser of the response to the 2018 Novichok poisonings in Salisbury and Amesbury, Cosford led the co-ordination of local medical workers, and delivered advice to the public, including warning that there was little risk to the public, whilst advising that "as a precaution, we still advise the public not to pick up any strange items such as needles, syringes or unusual containers". In the same year he had to deal with a surge in cases of flu, and also announced that PHE had created a new air pollution tool to calculate the cost of air pollution. The following year, he urged for the avoidance of cars idling around the school gates.

== Lung cancer ==
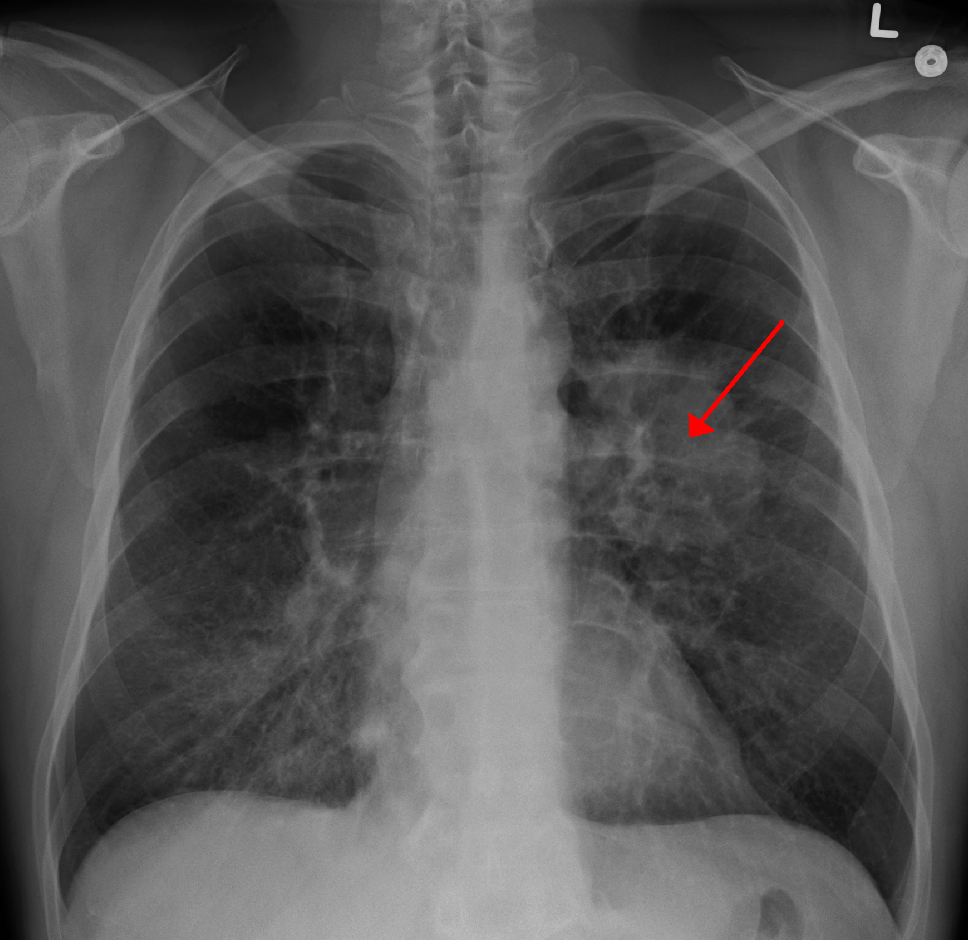
Chest X-ray showing lung cancer

Having been previously physically fit and never smoked, in 2017 Cosford was diagnosed with lung cancer. Cosford was an active cyclist, having spent years cycling in London traffic on his Brompton folding bicycle. He had previously cycled from London to Berlin, and completed the Paris-Brest-Paris ride within 90 hour, and cycled between Land's End and John O'Groats within a week. Six months prior to his diagnosis he had been training on 600 km bike routes. Following some shortness of breath on exertion, a chest X-ray confirmed a large collection of fluid in the lung with a collapsed left lung. The diagnosis was an inoperable lung cancer accompanied by spread to the liver. Although he could not prove it, he suspected that air pollution in London contributed to his diagnosis and stated that "of all the risk factors, air pollution seems to me the most likely cause of my own disease." In 2018, he delivered his first public speech on his diagnosis at the Royal Society of Medicine, in London.

In 2019, his diagnosis obliged him to step down from his role as director for health protection and medical director of PHE. That year, he was lead author of an article in the Journal of the Royal Society of Medicine discussing lung cancer in people who have never smoked. The paper presented findings that lung cancer was associated with a stigma, and that the number of people with lung cancer who have never smoked was increasing, with outdoor pollution as a significant contributory factor, in addition to passive smoke and occupational carcinogen exposure. (Note: Despite the general decline in lung cancer rates, the rate of lung cancer in non-smokers has been noted to be increasing.) Although passive smoking was contributory, it reported, it was not the main reason for the rise in cases.

During this time his diagnosis had changed his view on assisted dying, leading him to publish on the topic in The BMJ. In the article he called for policies on assisted dying to be reviewed, writing "My biggest fear around dying is lack of control. The lack of ability to advance the end a little, to take control of my final days."

== COVID-19 pandemic ==
In his emeritus role Cosford appeared frequently on national media to report regularly during the early days of the COVID-19 pandemic. At the beginning of March 2020, during the early rises in COVID-19 cases in the UK, he reported that the numbers were much higher than appeared. Throughout the early lockdowns, he continued to work whilst having to self-isolate.

== Awards and honours ==
Cosford was a fellow of the Faculty of Public Health, and held an honorary senior fellowship at the University of Cambridge. In 2018 he received an honorary degree of Doctor of Public Health (DrPH). He was appointed Companion of the Order of the Bath (CB) in 2016 for his role in the response to the ebola outbreak in West Africa, and Knight Commander of the Order of the Bath (KCB) in 2021 for his services to public health.

== Death ==
Cosford died on 5 April 2021, at the age of 57. He is survived by his wife Gillian Leng, a son and a daughter from his first marriage, and two stepdaughters. Following his death, tributes were received from the British Society for Antimicrobial Chemotherapy, Roger Kirby on behalf of the Royal Society of Medicine, Matt Hancock, Stephen Powis, Jeremy Hunt, Patrick Vallance and Chris Whitty.

== Selected publications ==
- Cosford, Paul; Arnold, Elaine (1992). "Eating disorders in later life: A review". International Journal of Geriatric Psychiatry. 7 (7): 491–498. doi:10.1002/gps.930070707. ISSN 1099-1166. S2CID 144430214.
- Cosford, Paul A.; O'Mahony, Mary; Angell, Emma; Bickler, Graham; Crawshaw, Shirley; Glencross, Janet; Horsley, Stephen S.; McCloskey, Brian; Puleston, Richard; Seare, Nichola; Tobin, Martin D. (7 December 2006). "Public health professionals' perceptions toward provision of health protection in England: a survey of expectations of Primary Care Trusts and Health Protection Units in the delivery of health protection". BMC Public Health. 6 (1): 297. doi:10.1186/1471-2458-6-297. ISSN 1471-2458. PMC 1712342. PMID 17156421.
- Cosford, Paul A.; Leng, Gillian C.; Thomas, Justyn (18 April 2007). "Screening for abdominal aortic aneurysm". The Cochrane Database of Systematic Reviews (2) CD002945. doi:10.1002/14651858.CD002945.pub2. ISSN 1469-493X. PMID 17443519.
- Cosford, P. (4 November 2014). "Advantages of airport screening for Ebola". BMJ (Clinical Research Ed.). 349 g6585. doi:10.1136/bmj.g6585. ISSN 1756-1833. PMID 25371224. S2CID 21797160.
- Newton, John N.; Cosford, Paul (20 October 2018). "Partnerships with the alcohol industry: opportunities and risks". The Lancet. 392 (10156): 1401–1402. doi:10.1016/S0140-6736(18)32333-X. ISSN 0140-6736. PMID 30244819. S2CID 52340913.
- Vardoulakis, Sotiris; Kettle, Rachel; Cosford, Paul; Lincoln, Paul; Holgate, Stephen; Grigg, Jonathan; Kelly, Frank; Pencheon, David (June 2018). "Local action on outdoor air pollution to improve public health". International Journal of Public Health. 63 (5): 557–565. doi:10.1007/s00038-018-1104-8. ISSN 1661-8564. PMID 29679104. S2CID 4984147.
- Cosford, Paul (30 September 2020). "The bench: reflections on an incurable diagnosis and control at the end of life—an essay by Paul Cosford". BMJ. 371 m3716. doi:10.1136/bmj.m3716. ISSN 1756-1833. PMID 32998866. S2CID 222069101.
- Bhopal, Anand; Peake, Michael D.; Gilligan, David; Cosford, Paul (25 April 2019). "Lung cancer in never-smokers: a hidden disease". Journal of the Royal Society of Medicine. 112 (7): 269–271. doi:10.1177/0141076819843654. ISSN 0141-0768. PMC 6613278. PMID 31022354.
