= Immigration health surcharge =

The immigration health surcharge was introduced by the Cameron–Clegg coalition by the Immigration (Health Charge) Order 2015, made under the provisions of the Immigration Act 2014, to deal with the issue of medical tourism involving the NHS in England. Once the surcharge is paid people are entitled to use the NHS in a similar way to UK residents.

== Extent of abuse ==
It is alleged that health tourists in the UK often target the NHS for its free-at-the-point-of-care treatment, allegedly costing the NHS up to £200 million. A study in 2013 showed that the UK was a net importer of medical tourists in ten of the eleven years between 2000 and 2010.

In the summer of 2015 immigration officers worked with staff in St George's University Hospitals NHS Foundation Trust to train staff "to make savings by better identifying overseas, chargeable patients". In October 2016 the trust claimed "that individuals are currently offering paid assistance to women in Nigeria to have their babies for free on the NHS at St George's" and consequently announced plans to require proof of eligibility for the non-emergency maternity care of pregnant women. It was estimated that £4.6 million a year was spent on care for ineligible patients. A pilot scheme to check whether patients were entitled to free NHS care in 18 NHS trusts, 11 in London, for two months in 2017 asked 8,894 people for two forms of ID prior to non-emergency care of which 50 were not eligible for free NHS treatment. Campaigners claimed this was "part of the Government's hostile environment policy", and that in Newham hospital, which billed patients found to be ineligible a total of £104,706 as part of this pilot, "you will see huge signs saying you may not be eligible for free NHS treatment".

=== History ===
Aneurin Bevan dealt with the political issue in his essay, "A Free Health Service" (1952):

One of the consequences of the universality of the British Health Service is the free treatment of foreign visitors. This has given rise to a great deal of criticism, most of it ill-informed and some of it deliberately mischievous. Why should people come to Britain and enjoy the benefits of the free Health Service when they do not subscribe to the national revenues? So the argument goes. The fact is, of course, that visitors to Britain subscribe to the national revenues as soon as they start consuming certain commodities, drink and tobacco for example, and entertainment. They make no direct contribution to the cost of the Health Service any more than does a British citizen.

— "A Free Health Service", In Place of Fear (1952)

He said that the cost of treating visitors was negligible, but the costs of administering checks would be great:

For if the sheep are to be separated from the goats both must be classified. What began as an attempt to keep the Health Service for ourselves would end by being a nuisance to everybody.

The whole agitation has a nasty taste. Instead of rejoicing at the opportunity to practice a civilized principle, Conservatives have tried to exploit the most disreputable emotions in this among many other attempts to discredit socialized medicine.

== Ordinarily resident status ==
Eligibility for free care NHS treatment is based on a person being ordinarily resident in the UK. Amendments to the National Health Service (Charges to Overseas Visitors) Regulations 1989 have excluded a number of vulnerable groups from being eligible for free healthcare, including failed asylum seekers, undocumented migrants and those who had overstayed their visa. Very extensive guidance has been repeatedly issued to NHS organisations on the implementation of the rules, but with little effect because NHS organisations, unlike commercial health providers, are not organised to check eligibility.

== Entrance to the United Kingdom ==
People moving to the UK from outside of the Common Travel Area for longer than six months are required to pay a surcharge of £1035 per year, paid upfront for the entire visa term upon applying for a visa or visa renewal. The surcharge was introduced in April 2015 and has raised £175m, with 450,000 surcharges issued in the first year. People from North Korea have to pay for this surcharge in cash only. It was raised from £200 to £400 a year in 2018, to £624 in 2020, and to the current rate in February 2024. NHS trusts may have to loan overseas recruits funds to pay these upfront costs. A discounted rate of £776 per year is charged to people under 18 and people on student visas, as well as visitors on youth mobility visas. The NHS spends an average of £470/per individual a year, the majority of which is raised from general taxation of visitors as well as residents, on treating the people who pay the surcharge. In 2018–2019, £251 million was collected.

== Payment to the NHS ==
Charges for treatment for those not entitled to free treatment – ie those who have not paid the surcharge – were set at 150% of the actual cost to the NHS in 2015.

Lewisham and Greenwich NHS Trust has used Experian to identify overseas visitors who could be charged for NHS treatment. NHS England has encouraged other trusts to do likewise, having identified 51 NHS trusts with an "income opportunity" from overseas visitors.

== Criticism ==
There is evidence that the existence of the charging regime deters people from seeking early treatment, and that will incur additional costs, and in the case of infectious conditions, risks to public health. Women are thought to be particularly vulnerable as they are excluded from maternity care and have no access to free abortions.

Schedule 1 of the National Health Service (Charges to Overseas Visitors) Regulations 2015 has a list of infectious conditions in respect of which there are no charges. Family planning services, palliative care and services provided for the diagnosis and treatment of sexually transmitted infections are also exempt from charges.

The surcharge applies to people who are admitted as children and granted limited leave to remain. It has been criticised as part of the Home Office hostile environment policy.

The Royal College of Nursing said in 2018 that migrants working in the NHS should be exempt from the surcharge because this would help tackle the health service's staffing crisis. The surcharge applies to each member of the family, and the college quoted the case of a Kenyan nurse working in Luton, whose children had to return to Kenya because she could not afford to pay £3,600 to ensure that she, her partner and four children could receive NHS care during her three-year stint working in the NHS.

The Royal College of Physicians, the Royal College of Paediatrics and Child Health, the Royal College of Obstetricians and Gynaecologists and the Faculty of Public Health called for the suspension of all NHS overseas visitor charges in December 2018. They said that the regulations were a danger to health because they deterred people with infectious conditions from seeking early treatment, and undermined trust in doctors.

During the COVID-19 pandemic the Doctors' Association UK called for frontline healthcare workers and their families to be exempted from the Immigration Health Surcharge in recognition of their service to the UK. The Labour Party subsequently took up the cause and tabled an amendment to the Immigration Bill at Prime Minister's Questions. The Government confirmed that healthcare workers would be exempt from the surcharge in the coming days and later extending this to the dependents of NHS workers.

== See also ==
- Healthcare in the United Kingdom
