= American Academy of Physician Associates =

- Formation: May 20, 1968; 58 years ago
- Type: Professional association
- Tax ID no.: 23-7067770
- Legal status: 501(c)(6)
- Headquarters: Alexandria, Virginia
- Members: 73,000
- President: Jason Prevelige
- CEO: Lisa Gables
- Website: www.aapa.org
- Formerly called: American Academy of Physician Assistants

The American Academy of Physician Associates (AAPA), previously named the American Academy of Physician Assistants, is a professional association for physician assistants/associates (PAs) in the United States. It is headquartered in Alexandria, Virginia.

== History ==
The Duke University Physician Assistant Program was established in 1965 as the first formalized PA program in the United States and graduated its inaugural class in October 1967. In April 1968, the recent graduates of the Duke PA program, along with current students, began organizing a professional organization, incorporating as the "American Association of Physician's Assistants" in North Carolina on May 20, 1968. Within three years, the organization expanded its membership beyond the local community and elected leadership representing various regions across the nation. In 1971, the name was changed to the "American Academy of Physicians' Associates" and it published its first official journal, Physician's Associate. The organization adopted the name "American Academy of Physician's Assistants" in 1973, and then "American Academy of Physician Assistants" after dropping the apostrophe from "physician" in 1981. On May 24, 2021, the AAPA House of Delegates approved changing the profession's title from "physician assistant" to "physician associate" by a vote of 198 to 68.
