= Physician assistant in anaesthesia =

Type of healthcare worker in the UK

In the United Kingdom, a physician assistant in anaesthesia (PAA) is a healthcare worker who provides anaesthesia under the medical direction and supervision of a consultant or specialist anaesthetist. They complete a two-year part-time MSc at University College London or two-year part-time PgDip Lancaster University or a 27-month full-time PgDip at the University of Birmingham. It is classed as a medical associate profession. To be eligible to study for the above courses, a candidate must have a previous degree in a biomedical or biological science subject, or at least three years of recognised previous healthcare experience in another role such as a nurse or operating department practitioner (ODP) and recent academic study.

The role was introduced into the UK National Health Service in 2004, under the title of anaesthesia practitioner. This was later changed in 2007 to physicians' assistant (anaesthesia), abbreviated to PA(A). The Association of Physicians' Assistants Anaesthesia sought another name change to anaesthesia associate in July 2019, with that organisation becoming the Association of Anaesthesia Associates. In the same month, the government announced that the General Medical Council (GMC) would regulate anaesthesia associates as a distinct profession. The GMC started regulation of the profession in December 2024 and also provided quality assurance of all three of the AA courses in the UK in April 2025.

Serious concerns about the lack of regulation, transparency of professional background, and scope of practise, of anaesthesia associates were raised by Anaesthetists United, a grass-roots group of anaesthetists, triggering an Extraordinary General Meeting of the Royal College of Anaesthetists (RCoA) on 17 October 2023. All six motions were passes with significant majorities including on a call to pause recruitment of AAs until the RCoA consultation had been completed and the professional standard to inform patients clearly when AAs are involved in their care and their role. The RCoA published an interim scope of practice in December 2024.

Secretary of State for Health and Social Care Wes Streeting announced an independent review led by Gillian Leng, the former chief executive of the National Institute for Health and Care Excellence and president of the Royal Society of Medicine, into the safety and effectiveness of PA and AA roles in November 2024. The Leng Review was published in July 2025 and recommended that the title should be renamed to "physician assistant in anaesthesia" (PAA), that they should follow the interim scope of practice set by the RCoA, have opportunities to develop their careers including the potential to prescribe, request non-ionising radiation and advanced practice. NHS England, in their response to the review, said that the role would be immediately renamed to physician assistant in anaesthesia (PAA).
