= Leng Review =

2025 NHS review of physician associates

- Original title: The Leng review: an independent review into physician associate and anaesthesia associate professions
- Presented: 16 July 2025
- Commissioned by: Wes Streeting, Department of Health and Social Care
- Author: Gillian Leng
- Subject: Physician associates and anaesthesia associates in the NHS

Official website
- www.gov.uk/government/collections/independent-review-of-physician-associates-and-anaesthesia-associates

The Leng Review was an independent review commissioned by the UK government that examined the safety and effectiveness of physician associates (PAs) and anaesthesia associates (AAs) within the National Health Service (NHS). It was launched in November 2024 by Wes Streeting, the Secretary of State for Health and Social Care, and led by Gillian Leng. The review found the evidence on these roles limited, low-quality, and inconclusive. It recommended renaming them to physician assistants and physician assistants in anaesthesia, restricting their scope and introducing clearer supervision and standards. The United Kingdom government accepted all 18 recommendations made by the review and pledged to implement them in full. Medical and professional bodies generally welcomed the review as pragmatic but criticised its limitations and the reliance on local implementation.

== Background ==
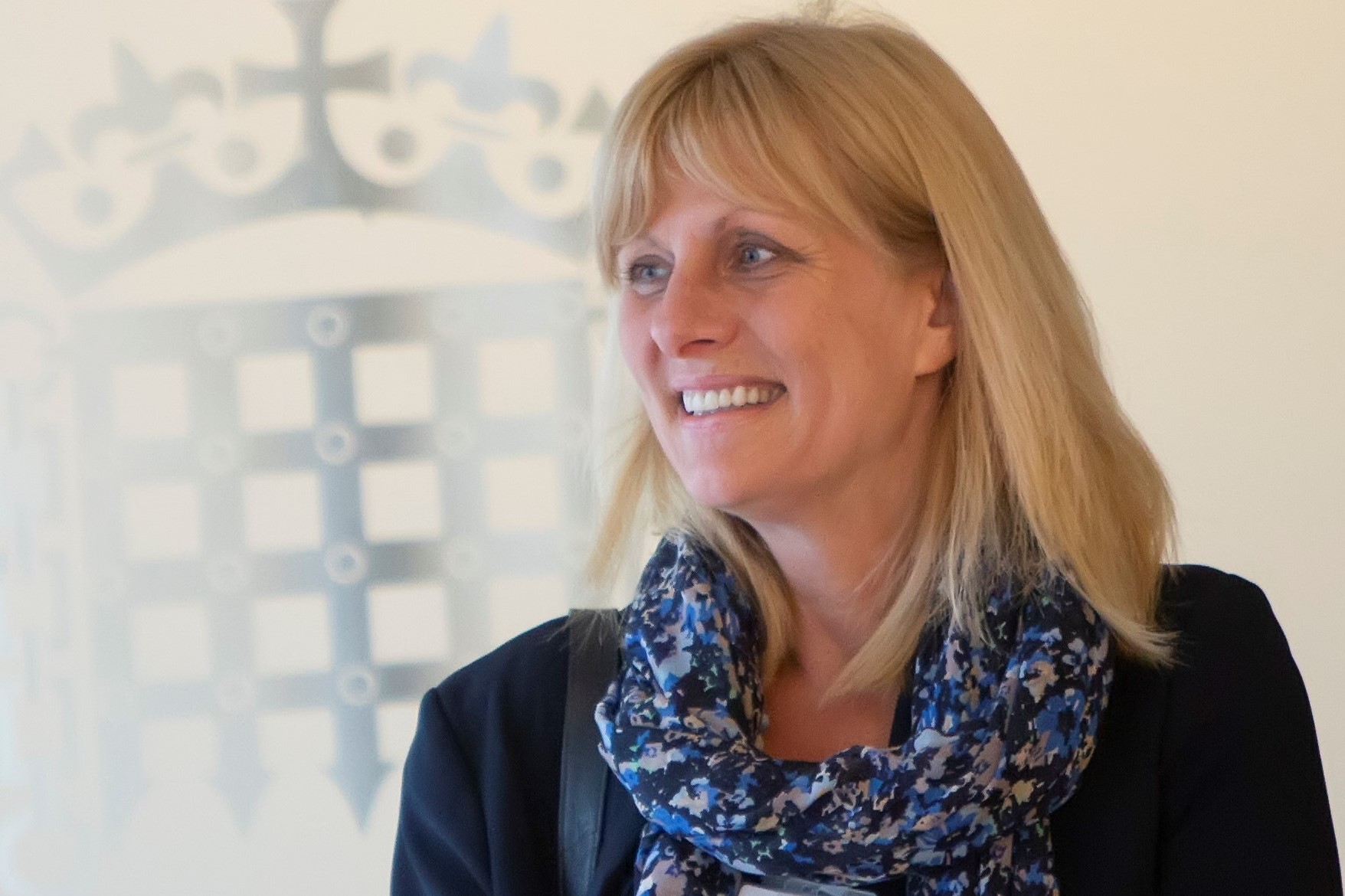
Gillian Leng, who led the review

PAs and AAs were introduced into the NHS in the early 2000s. They were presented as mid‑level medical roles designed to help ease shortages of doctors and support multidisciplinary teams. The PA model was adapted from the United States and first piloted in the UK in general practice. Training was around two years at postgraduate level, far shorter than for doctors. The roles were initially small scale but gradually expanded into hospitals and primary care networks. Over time the PA and AA workforce increased, especially via national education and funding schemes.

Concerns grew that PAs and AAs were being used to substitute for doctors with undiagnosed patients or in high risk settings. Cases of misdiagnosis, (Note: The British Medical Association compiled 600 reports of serious concerns about PAs, including missed cases of cancer and sepsis. Emily Chesterton, a 30-year-old woman, was misdiagnosed with anxiety by a PA on two visits before dying of a pulmonary embolism. Pamela Marking, 77, was seen in an accident and emergency department by a PA who attributed abdominal pain and bleeding to a nosebleed before she died following surgery to repair a femoral hernia days later. Ben Peters, 25, died from an aortic dissection after attending Manchester Royal Infirmary with chest pain, shortness of breath, and vomiting. He was seen by a PA who discharged him following tests and discussion with a consultant. Peters, who the PA diagnosed with a panic attack and gastric inflammation, died within 24 hours of his discharge, having never seen a doctor.) boundary breaches, and confusion over their status fed into wider worries. Patients sometimes did not realise they were not seeing a doctor and saw the title as misleading. Some PAs had explicitly identified themselves as doctors to patients. Moreover, some were shown to have exceeded their training and lawful remit by prescribing medicines and ordering medical imaging using ionising radiation. (Note: Despite PAs and AAs not legally being allowed to prescribe drugs or order tests and medical imaging involving ionising radiation (for example, X‑rays and CT scans), they have done so. In Leeds Teaching Hospitals NHS Trust, PAs made more than 1,000 referrals for ionising‑radiation scans before the ability was blocked. PAs at Calderdale and Huddersfield NHS Foundation Trust prescribed medications 22 times.) Doctors and regulators worried about inadequate supervision and impact on doctors' training. Moreover, there was controversy over PAs and AAs having better working conditions and salaries than newly qualified doctors despite being less capable. These concerns led to the commissioning of the Leng Review.

== Process ==
Leng review figure showing its evidence strategy

The review was commissioned in November 2024 by the Secretary of State for Health and Social Care, Wes Streeting. The government tasked Professor Gillian Leng with leading an independent review of PAs and AAs. The review's remit was to assess whether the roles were safe and effective in multidisciplinary teams. The review was framed as a way to determine the safety and effectiveness of the roles and inform the NHS workforce plan. The final report was published on 16 July 2025.

The review used a mixed‑methods approach to gather evidence. It commissioned an independent literature review and opened a call for evidence inviting trusts and education providers to submit audits and reports. National bodies also contributed. For example, the Care Quality Commission analysed documents discussing PAs and AAs. The team screened records for relevance and assessed quality using standard checklists. Over 600 items were reviewed, with 24 core quantitative studies on safety and effectiveness. The review also held surveys, focus groups and one‑to‑one interviews with over 1,000 patients, clinicians, managers, educators, and international experts.

== Findings and recommendations ==
The review found that the evidence on safety, effectiveness, and cost-effectiveness for physician associates (PAs) and anaesthesia associates (AAs) was limited, of low quality, and inconclusive. Studies were mostly observational and small. Similarly, the review found the available evidence inconclusive on whether PAs and AAs can safely substitute for doctors. Although it found no convincing reasons to abolish the roles, it found a significant number of issues that necessitated change to them. In primary care, there was not enough evidence to support using PAs as substitutes for doctors. PAs and AAs being responsible for diagnosing patients was seen as high-risk.

The review recommended renaming PAs as physician assistants and AAs as physician assistants in anaesthesia. The roles should remain clearly supportive and should not substitute for doctors. Newly qualified physician assistants should work in secondary care for at least two years. They should not see undiagnosed patients except within agreed national protocols. A named doctor should be the line manager and supervisor for each assistant. Standardised clothing and information should distinguish assistants from doctors. A permanent faculty should set training and qualification standards with the relevant medical royal colleges.

== Aftermath ==
Professor Leng sets out 18 recommendations [...] the government is accepting these recommendations in full

— Wes Streeting, Secretary of State for Health and Social Care, July 2025

Many stakeholders welcomed the review as a constructive, pragmatic, and balanced attempt to address concerns over physician associates (PAs) and anaesthesia associates (AAs). The UK government accepted all 18 recommendations made by the review. The Secretary of State for Health and Social Care, Wes Streeting, pledged to implement them in full. The British Medical Association argued that the review did not go far enough to protect patients and left key decisions to local employers. The Doctors' Association UK claimed the recommendations prioritised workforce convenience over safety. Meanwhile, United Medical Associate Professionals (UMAPS), the trade union representing PAs and AAs, warned implementation could harm staff, patients, and access to care. It later launched a legal challenge, claiming inadequate consultation. On 16 July 2026, the High Court of Justice refused UMAPS permission to seek a judicial review on all claimed grounds.

Implementation was led by the Department of Health and Social Care, supported by NHS England, the General Medical Council, medical royal colleges, and NHS trusts. The government accepted an immediate change of the roles' names to physician assistants and physician assistants in anaesthesia, but a formal, legal change to their names required Parliament to pass new legislation. NHS England asked employers to change workplace titles and descriptions to avoid confusion, while the General Medical Council began updating guidance and curricula to distinguish PAs and AAs from doctors. However, several of its recommendations have still not been implemented. Moreover, legal titles remained unchanged, national scope and supervision standards were not yet in place, and several commentators said implementation still depended heavily on local decisions. A government consultation into reforming the General Medical Council published in 2026 included questions on changing the titles of PAs and AAs. Advanced practitioners have also become subject to similar concerns to those concerning AAs and PAs.
