= Hadiza Bawa-Garba case =

Medical controversy in Leicester, England

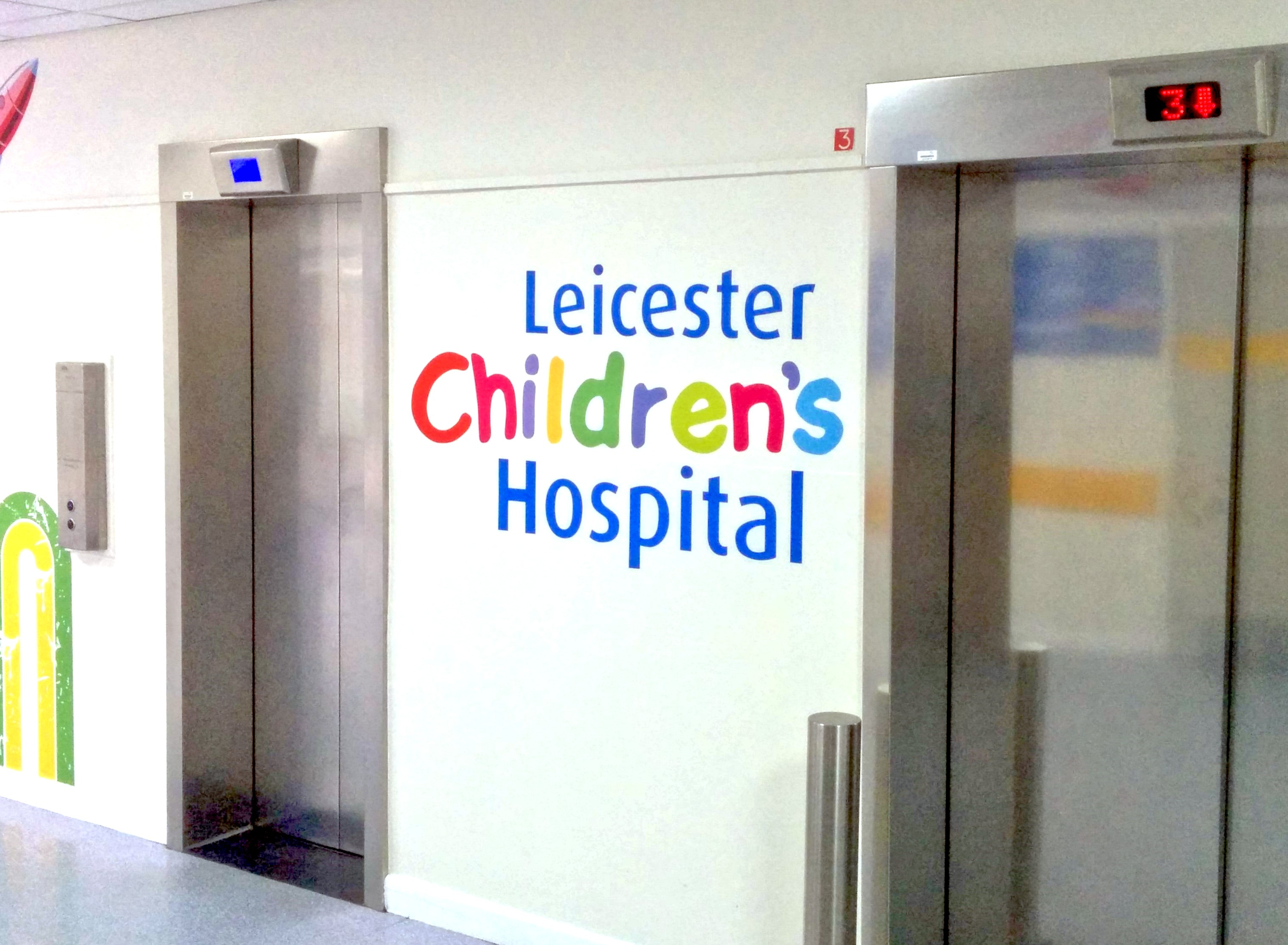
Balmoral building, Leicester Children's Hospital, LRI.

Jack Adcock, a 6-year-old child, was admitted to Leicester Royal Infirmary (LRI) on 18 February 2011. He died later that day, in part because of failings in his treatment.

Dr. Hadiza Bawa-Garba, the resident doctor who treated him (under the supervision of duty consultant Dr Stephen O'Riordan) and a nurse, Isabel Amaro, were subsequently found guilty of manslaughter on the grounds of gross negligence. Both were subsequently struck off their respective professional registers, although Bawa-Garba had that decision overturned at appeal.

There is an ongoing debate about the judgements against Bawa-Garba, partly around Bawa-Garba's personal culpability versus a context of systemic failures, and partly around the possible use of her reflective notes about her own practice as evidence.

== Background ==
In 2010, the Medical Programme Board demonstrated almost a quarter of junior doctors dropped out of their NHS training in England after two years, and according to Unions, this was due to high workload. Denied by the department of Health, the BMA highlighted issues around the 'European Working Time Directive', shift patterns and understaffing.

In 2016, a report issued by the Royal College of Physicians stressed "gaps in rotas, poor access to basic facilities and an ever-growing workload" for doctors in training. Despite feeling valued by their patients, 80% of these doctors reported excessive stress, either 'sometimes' or 'often'. The report presented "a bleak picture of the conditions junior doctors currently face and the impact this is having on the patients they care for every day" and this was at "a harmful and unsustainable level". The problem of rota gaps and high levels of stress and its resulting effect on staff morale was also later emphasized at the 2017 BMA annual representative meeting.

== Timeline ==
=== Jack Adcock's death ===
On 18 February 2011, Jack Adcock, a 6-year-old boy, was referred to Leicester Royal Infirmary by his GP and admitted to a Children's Assessment Unit (CAU) at 10.20am. He had Down's syndrome and had an atrioventricular septal defect repaired at 4.5 months of age. He was on an angiotensin converting enzyme inhibitor, enalapril. He presented with diarrhoea, vomiting and difficulty breathing.

He was treated by Dr Hadiza Bawa-Garba, a specialist registrar (SpR) in year six of her postgraduate training (ST6) who had recently returned from maternity leave, who was responsible for Jack's care. There was no senior consultant available, leaving her with sole responsibility for the whole CAU. Rota gaps had meant that Bawa-Garba had to cover the work of two other doctors and the on-call consultant (Dr Stephen O'Riordan) was off-site in Warwick until 4.30pm that day, as he had not realised he was on-call. The morning hand-over between the incoming and outgoing teams was not completed due to a cardiac arrest call.

Soon after admission, Bawa-Garba was alerted to Jack's condition by the nursing staff in CAU. After clinical examination, she found him to be dehydrated. A point-of-care venous blood gas test revealed profound Metabolic acidosis with a lactate of 11.4 mmol/L and serum pH of 7.084. She diagnosed hypovolaemia from gastroenteritis, and administered intravenous fluid replacement. Blood tests were sent off for laboratory analysis and a chest x-ray was requested.

Bawa-Garba made a number of mistakes. She did not ask the on-call consultant to review Jack during an afternoon handover meeting at 4.30pm but did share abnormal laboratory results with him which he duly wrote down in his notebook. He wrote down that the child's pH was 7.08 and lactate of 11. However, the consultant did not review the patient as he said later that he expected Bawa-Garba to "stress" these results to him. It was the first occasion they were working on the same shift.

Although she correctly omitted the patient's medicine enalapril on the drug chart, she did not make it clear to the child's mother not to give it. Jack's mother subsequently asked a nurse, who told her incorrectly that she could give it. Jack's mother gave it to the child that day at 7pm which led to the child's circulatory shock and death. This was the custom and practice in the hospital – to permit parents to administer medicines in the hospital before being prescribed.

Separately, a hospital-wide IT failure delayed test results being available until 4.30pm, despite the blood samples being sent at 11am. After phoning the laboratory, the team received the blood results showing CRP 97, Urea 17.1, Creatinine 252. The chest radiograph was undertaken an hour later at 12 noon, but was not reported by a radiologist. Bawa-Garba reviewed the radiograph at 3pm, identified left upper lobe pneumonia, and prescribed intravenous cefuroxime. A repeat venous gas showed an improvement in the pH to 7.24. She reviewed Jack again in CAU, and saw that he had improved, and was sitting up and having a drink. The antibiotics were administered by the nursing staff at 4pm. The hospital Trust has acknowledged systemic failures contributed to events.

Earlier that day, Bawa-Garba had admitted a terminally-ill child with a Do not resuscitate (DNAR) order to the side-room on the ward. This child was seen by another consultant during the day and discharged home in the afternoon. At 7pm, unbeknownst to Bawa-Garba, Jack was transferred from CAU to the same side-room on the ward. At around 8pm Jack began to deteriorate further, whereupon the on-call anaesthetic and paediatric registrars were fast-bleeped. Despite urgent treatment, he suffered cardiac arrest, CPR was commenced, and endotracheal intubation was carried out. Bawa-Garba attended the cardiac arrest call to the side-room believing it to be the terminally-ill child she admitted earlier with a DNAR order. She requested the team to stop resuscitation, but realized it to be the wrong patient within 2 minutes, and therefore recommenced CPR.

Jack Adcock died of a cardiac arrest as a result of sepsis at 9.20pm.

=== Isabel Amaro cases ===
On 2 November 2015, Amaro was sentenced to a 2-year suspended jail sentence, having been found guilty of manslaughter by gross negligence. Her monitoring of Jack Adcock's condition and record-keeping were criticized. She was subsequently struck off the nursing register.

=== Hadiza Bawa-Garba cases ===
On 4 November 2015, Bawa-Garba was found guilty of manslaughter by gross negligence in Nottingham Crown Court before a jury directed by Mr Justice Andrew Nicol after a 4-week trial. She was found guilty by a majority verdict 10–2 after 25 hours of deliberation. She was represented by Zoe Johnson QC, with prosecution led by Andrew Johnson QC. The following month, she was given a 2-year suspended jail sentence. She appealed against the sentence, but the appeal was denied in December 2016.

The Medical Practitioners Tribunal Service suspended Bawa-Garba for 12 months on 13 June 2017. The General Medical Council successfully appealed and Bawa-Garba was struck off on 25 January 2018.

On 13 August 2018, Bawa-Garba won an appeal against being struck off, restoring the one-year suspension.

Many healthcare professionals have raised concerns that Bawa-Garba was being unduly punished for failings in the system, notably the understaffing on the day. The consultant on-call, Dr Stephen O'Riordan, who was ultimately responsible for the care of all children on the day - as the consultant in charge - received no formal consequences. He moved to Ireland following the event.

She completed her specialist training and gained consultant status in April 2022.

== E-portfolio ==
A series of high-profile medical scandals including the Bristol heart scandal and The Shipman Inquiry has influenced the proposals of revalidation, that is, the relicensing of doctors. The process was put on hold in 2005, when Dame Janet Smith criticized the plans as inadequate for identifying dangerous doctors. Revalidation was eventually implemented in late 2012. All doctors in the UK who wished to retain their licences to practise were informed that they were legally required to be revalidated every five years, based on a combination of demonstrating up-to-date knowledge by fulfilling CPD (continuous professional development) requirements of the Colleges and providing multisource feedback from patients and colleagues. This was designed to demonstrate they were up to date and fit to practise. Revalidation, according to BMA council GMC working party chair Brian Keighley 2012, was intended "to encourage quality in healthcare for patients through self-assessment, appraisal, continuing medical education and reflective practice." He also stated that, "Over the past 10 years there has been confusion and tension between those who believe it is a screening tool for the incompetent, rather than a formative, educational process for the individual."

Since 2012, several concerns have been highlighted including in 2016, that for junior doctors "A large number of doctors are required to 'reflect' on Serious Unresolved Incidents (SUIs) and Significant Event (SE) information as part of their specialty training. This could therefore create a significant administrative burden and result in cases of double jeopardy."

As is common for clinicians, Bawa-Garba kept reflective learning material in an e-portfolio as part of her training, including relating to the treatment of Jack Adcock. This material was used against her, although to what degree has been disputed. Her defense team have stated that her e-portfolio was not used in the 2018 case. The e-portfolio was not used explicitly in the 2015 case, but had been seen by expert witnesses.

This has raised concerns that clinicians would be concerned to be honest in their own reflective learning.

== Reaction ==
There is broad agreement that serious errors were made in Adcock's treatment. However, there has been a public debate about the background, context and pressures in which doctors work, and what happens when mistakes are made. The discussion centered on the issues of what systems and processes are in place that make mistakes less likely, and improve the chances of detecting them when they do occur. In the case of Dr Bawa-Garba, the NHS Trust in question recognised there were systemic failures and pressures which contributed to the death of a patient. Dr Bawa-Garba had an excellent record until then. Dr Jeeves Wijesuriya, the then junior doctors' committee chair for the British Medical Association (BMA), argued that these systemic shortcomings were not adequately considered in the initial trial.

At the end of January 2018, BMA council chair Chaand Nagpaul expressed concerns over doctors' fears and challenges in working under pressure in the NHS. He explained that without clarity from the General Medical Council (GMC) and others, issues surrounding recording reflective learning would result in defensive practice and failure to learn from experience. The BMA, in response, would, therefore, take actions to liaise with the GMC regarding the culture of fear, blame and system failings. Guidance to doctors on appraisal and recording reflection have also been included, as well as the launch of an online reporting system. Jeremy Hunt warned of the "unintended consequences" of the ruling, saying that "For patients to be safe, we need doctors to be able to reflect completely openly and freely about what they have done, to learn from mistakes, to spread best practice around the system, to talk openly with their colleagues."

The Doctors' Association UK, a campaign and lobbying group for Doctors and the NHS, campaigned to raise awareness of system failures in the case.

During the period that the MPTS and GMC suspended and then erased Dr Bawa-Garba, confidence among doctors in England that the GMC is regulating doctors well and that its procedures are fair fell. The GMC released a FAQ about the case, covering issues such as what doctors should do if concerned about staffing levels and reflective practice.

The UK government introduced a series of reforms in response to the case, with a report being released in June 2018.
