= Physician assistant =

Mid-level health care provider

A physician assistant or physician associate (PA) is a type of non-physician practitioner. While these job titles are used internationally, there is significant variation in training and scope of practice from country to country, and sometimes between smaller jurisdictions such as states or provinces. Depending on location, PAs practice semi-autonomously under the supervision of a physician, or autonomously perform a subset of medical services classically provided by physicians.

The educational model was initially based upon the accelerated training of physicians in the United States during the shortage of qualified medical providers during World War II. Since then, the use of PAs has spread to at least 16 countries around the world. In the US, PAs may diagnose illnesses, develop and manage treatment plans, prescribe medications, and serve as a principal healthcare provider. In many states PAs are required to have a direct agreement with a physician. In the UK, PAs were introduced in 2003. They support the work of the healthcare team, but are dependent clinicians requiring supervision from a physician. They cannot prescribe medications nor request ionising radiation investigations (e.g., x-ray) in the UK. PAs are widely used in Canada. The model began during the Korean War and transitioned to the present concept in 2002. Skills and scope of privileges are similar to those in the US.

== Title and professional identity ==
The occupational title of physician assistant and physician associate originated in the United States in 1967 at Duke University. The role has been adopted in the US, Canada, United Kingdom, Republic of Ireland, Netherlands, New Zealand, India, Israel, Bulgaria, Myanmar, Switzerland, Liberia, Ghana, and by analogous names throughout Africa, each with their own nomenclature and education structure. In Malawi they are called clinical officers. Most of them study clinical medicine at the Malawi College of Health Sciences and other colleges within the country. Australia trialled the introduction of the role of Physician Assistant; however, currently PAs cannot register with the Australian Health Practitioner Regulation Agency (AHPRA), are not recognised under the Medicare Benefits Schedule (MBS) or the Pharmaceutical Benefit Scheme (PBS), and their wider implementation is not supported by the Royal Australian College of General Practitioners (RACGP). In 2021, the American Academy of Physician Assistants voted to rename itself the American Academy of Physician Associates (AAPA) and adopted "physician associate" as the preferred professional designation. U.S. state governments such as the one in Oregon have begun to implement statutory changes to reflect the name change in Oregon. The move has been controversial; critics of the name change feel the word "associate" could be misleading for patients trying to understand PAs' scope of practice, while proponents feel it better conveys the profession's collaborative and independent roles.

Jurisdiction	Title	Abbreviation	Test	Certifying Authority
United States	Physician Associate/Physician Assistant	PA-C	Physician Associate National Certification Exam	National Commission on Certification of Physician Associates with accompanying state-level certification.
Canada	Canadian Certified Physician Assistant	CCPA	Entry to Practice Examination	Physician Assistant Certification Council of Canada with accompanying provincial certification
United Kingdom	Physician Assistant (in England and Wales) Physician Associate (Scotland)	PA-R	Physician Associate Registration Assessment (PARA) from September 2025 Physician Associate National Examination (PANE); 2007-2025	Royal College of Physicians
Republic of Ireland	Physician Associate	PA	none	none
Kenya	Clinical officer	CO	Clinical Officers Licensing Examination	Clinical Officers Council
South Africa	Clinical Associate			
Malaysia	Assistant Medical Officer			Malaysia Medical Assistant Board (Lembaga Pembantu Perubatan Malaysia)
India	"Physician Assistant"& "Physician Associate" Both are now known as "Physician Associate"(NCAHP ACT 2021, Government of India)	PA	National common Entry and Exit Examination.	NCAHP, Ministry of Health and Family Welfare, Government of India.
Germany	Physician Assistant	PA	None	None
China	Assistant Doctor			
Papua New Guinea	Health Extension Officer			
Former Soviet Union	Feldsher			
Israel	Physician Assistant	PA-R		

== Services ==
Depending on jurisdiction, a physician assistant or associates may:

- conduct patient interviews and take medical histories
- conduct physical examinations, including the interpretation of clinical signs
- order and interpret diagnostic tests and exams (As per International labour Organisation code)
- diagnose illnesses
- formulate treatment plans
- coordinate and manage care
- perform medical procedures
- prescribe medications (As per International labour organisation norms if any)
- conduct clinical research
- provide patient counselling
- offer advice on preventative health care
- first assist in surgery
- Can serve as a clinical tutor/Demonstrator, assistant professor, associate professor, or professor (depending on academic qualifications along with experience).
- In Administrative sector, can serve as principal/Director, Dean etc. as per experience & Qualifications.

== Scope of practice and regulation ==
Physician assistant scope of practice vary by country and state. Physician assistant practice laws in a majority of US states have been updated in recent years to give PAs more autonomy and reduce onerous supervision language. A few states now allow PAs to practice under a "collaborative" agreement rather than with direct physician supervision. In the UK, the General Medical Council (GMC) has become the official regulator of physician associates in December 2024. England's 2025 Leng Review also recommended standard national policies, including a specific supervision model and a unique PA uniform to distinguish PAs from doctors.

== Workplaces ==
Physician assistants or associates train to work in settings such as hospitals, clinics and other types of health facilities, or virtually via telemedicine. PAs are commonly found working in teaching and research as well as hospital administration and other clinical environments. PAs may practice in primary care or Health Sciences specialties, including emergency medicine, surgery and cardiology.

== Employment growth and compensation ==
Physician assistant job growth in the 21st century has been substantial. In the United States, the U.S. Bureau of Labor Statistics reported that "demand for PAs is expected to grow 27% from 2022 to 2032, much faster than the average for all occupations". Median annual wages for U.S. physician assistants have increased to over $130,000 and are higher still in surgical and emergency medicine subspecialties. A number of sources have reported that the increasing demand for physician assistants is a result of physician shortages in primary care and increased use of team-based models of care.

== Training ==
Physician assistant (or associate) education is shorter than the medical degree required to become a physician (MD/DO). Most PAs in the United States have completed 4 years of undergraduate training followed by 2–3 years of Master's-level training, including both didactic training and clinical training. The didactic portions usually include microbiology, genetics, clinical anatomy and physiology, clinical pathophysiology, clinical medicine, clinical pharmacology, patient history & physical exam, clinical problem-solving, women's health, and applied clinical skills. The clinical year usually entails of 4-8 week rotations in surgery, family medicine, emergency medicine, OB/GYN, psychiatry, internal medicine, pediatrics, and other rotations depending on the school. In total, most United States PA Master's programs come out to about 100 semester credit hours (ranging from 95 to 122) or 150 quarter hours.

After training and graduation, most PAs in the US take the PANCE for board certification. The PANCE is a 300-question exam (five 60-question blocks) covering a wide variety of medical topics, assessing for entry-level competency of a PA. Unlike an MD, a PA's training typically does not involve residency training, although this is increasingly offered in a variety of specialties.

Renewal of certification is usually required every few years, varying by jurisdiction. In the US, many states require PAs to submit CME hours to demonstrate they are staying up to date for licensure renewal. The National Commission on Certification of PAs (NCCPA) requires 100 CME hours every 2 years to maintain certification. Every 10 years, the NCCPA requires PAs to take the PANRE (four 60-question blocks taken at once) or PANRE-LA (taken between years 7 and 9 of practice, consisting of twelve 25-question blocks), an exam that aims to test the competency of practicing PAs.

Some PAs go on to get doctorates (DMS/DMSc/DScPAS). These doctorates are professional doctorates most similar to a Doctor of Nursing Practice (DNP), but do not necessarily increase medical knowledge or scope of practice. While programs based in the United States have some level of variability, these doctorate programs are largely focused in academic research, health administration, and health leadership education.

== Diversity and representation ==
The PA profession in the United States continues to have recruitment and diversity issues, with the physician assistant workforce remaining predominantly white and male. A 2025 report by the Milbank Memorial Fund discovered that approximately 3.5% of recent PA graduates self-identified as Black, American Indian, Alaska Native, Native Hawaiian, or Pacific Islander, while about 6.4% of recent graduates self-identified as Hispanic.

This was in contrast to the findings of the 2025 AAPA Salary Report, in which over 85% of certified PAs self-identified as White. In response, professional organizations such as the AAPA have developed a diversity award as well as expanded existing programs which allow students from minority groups easier access into the profession.

== History ==
In 1961, Charles Hudson recommended that the American Medical Association create new medical provider certifications. Eugene A. Stead of the Duke University Medical Center assembled the first class of physician assistants in 1965, composed of four former US Navy Hospital Corpsmen. He based the curriculum of the PA program on his first-hand knowledge of the fast-track training of medical doctors during World War II. Two other physicians, Richard Smith at the University of Washington, and Hu Myers at Alderson-Broaddus College launched their own programs in the mid-late 1960s. J. Willis Hurst started the Emory University Physician Assistant Program in 1967.

The Liberian model of PAs was a curriculum intended for graduates to work in areas absent of physicians as physician substitutes. Advisors for this program included UNICEF, American physicians, and Agnes N. Dagbe, MS, RN, a Liberian nurse educated in the US. Additional training was done in the USSR. The Liberian government inaugurated the program in 1965 with Dagbe as PA program.

Beginning in January 1971, the US Army produced eight classes of physician assistants, at 30 students per class, through the Academy of Health Sciences, Brooke Medical Center (academically accredited by Baylor University).

In 2017, approximately 68% of physician assistants in the United States were women and approximately 32% were men.

The profession expanded globally. It can now be found in Afghanistan, Canada, Germany, Ghana, India, Israel, Liberia, the Netherlands, New Zealand, Saudi Arabia, and the United Kingdom. As a profession, physician assistants have greatly influenced the theory and conceptualization of socially accountable health professional education.

== Jurisdictions ==
=== Australia ===
Pilot programs using PAs from the USA were conducted in South Australia (ending in 2009) and Queensland (ending in 2010). The University of Queensland was the first to offer an education program for PAs, but ceased it in 2011 due to concerns over the uncertainty of the position in the workforce. Also in 2011, Health Workforce Australia began developing the role of physician assistant throughout the country culminating with registration and a PA Program based out of James Cook University (JCU). The Australian Society of Physician Assistants in 2011 published a code of practice. Despite initial optimism that the new profession would be successfully integrated into the health care system, in 2013 it was reported that the progress had floundered resulting in the majority of PAs in Australia being unemployed. As a result, JCU ceased offering the program around 2021.

As of 2026, Physician Assistants are not a recognised profession within Australia, and not eligible for both Medicare provider numbers or Australian Health Practitioner Regulation Agency registration.

=== Canada ===
As of 2024, there are approximately 1000 physician assistants working in healthcare settings in Canada. The first formally trained physician assistants graduated in 1984 from the Canadian Forces Medical Services School at Borden, Ontario. The Canadian Medical Association (CMA) recognized physician assistants as a health professional in 2003. Physician assistants are able to perform medical functions such as ordering tests, diagnosing diseases, prescribing medications, treating patients, educating patients and performing various medical and surgical procedures. Physician assistants are labeled under the federal government national occupational classification code 3124: allied primary health practitioners.

==== Education and certification (Canada) ====
The first civilian physician assistant education programs were launched in 2008 at the University of Manitoba and McMaster University. In 2010, a third civilian program was launched by the consortium of physician assistant education (University of Toronto, Northern Ontario School of Medicine, and The Michener Institute) while further programmes were added in 2024 at Dalhousie University and at the University of Calgary. A new programme has been announced to be housed at the University of Saskatchewan to start in 2025.

In Canada, the education of a physician assistant generally consists of three years of professional post-graduate university education. The education is delivered over a two calendar year time-frame by completing fall, winter and summer semesters for both years of the program in either a master level university physician assistant program or post-graduate professional university bachelor level physician assistant program. Physician assistant graduates become eligible for the certification exam by being a graduate of a Canadian physician assistant program that is recognized by the Physician Assistant Certification Council of Canada (Canadian Armed Forces physician assistant program, University of Manitoba, McMaster University and the consortium of physician assistant education all of which are accredited by the Canadian Medical Association).

==== Scope of practice (Canada) ====
Physician assistants resemble and provide many of the functions of physicians. Physician Assistants (PA) are academically prepared health care professionals who provide a broad range of medical services. PAs are physician extenders and not independent practitioners; they work with a degree of autonomy, negotiated and agreed on by the supervising physician(s) and the PA. PAs can work in any clinical setting to extend physician services. PAs complement existing services and aid in improving patient access to health care. A relationship with a supervising physician is essential to the role of the PA. " Physician assistants may be compared to the role of nurse practitioner by the general public and may be confused as the same profession. Nurse practitioners in Canada practice under an advanced nursing model. Physician assistants practice under a medical model, similarly modeled after medical school (physician) education. Nurse practitioners practice within their defined specific scope of practice autonomously and sometimes collaboratively. The defined scopes of a nurse practitioner include the areas of (family care, adults and paediatrics). Physician assistants are permitted to practice in all medical specialties by mirroring the practice of a physician with a full range of skills and scope by practicing both autonomously as a clinician and collaboratively with physicians when required. Some examples of practice areas for physician assistants include (emergency medicine, critical care medicine, cardiology, psychiatry, community and family medicine, neurology, surgery, orthopaedics, internal medicine, oncology, gastroenterology, military medicine, respirology, dermatology, women's health and many more specialities). Physician assistants may perform certain roles which have been traditionally only provided by physicians in clinical practice, making the PA's medical training over other providers unique in this regard.

==== Compensation (Canada) ====
Physician assistant salaries in civilian practice in Canada are relatively new and can range from approximately $80,000 CAD for entry level positions to $142,000 CAD a year for experienced providers which are not on call and up to $178,000 CAD for experienced providers which are on call. The physician assistant profession is newer to civilian practice in Canada. The compensation report published in 2019 by the Canadian Association of Physician Assistants outlines the typical salaries across Canada being an entry median salary of approximately $80,000 CAD and an experienced median salary of approximately $105,000 CAD.

==== Regulation (Canada) ====
Physician assistants are currently practicing across Canada in the Canadian Armed Forces as commissioned officers in domestic and international environments and have been in practice since the 1960s. Physician assistants outside of the Canadian Armed Forces practice usually in the public health care system in the provinces of Manitoba, Ontario, New Brunswick, Nova Scotia, and Alberta. Physician assistants have been regulated in Manitoba since 1999 and in New Brunswick since 2009 and are registrants of their respective provincial college of physicians and surgeons. Physician assistants in Ontario were introduced in 2007 to the public health system as a joint venture between the Ontario Ministry of Health and the Ontario Medical Association. In PEI, Alberta, Nova Scotia, Ontario, and Saskatchewan, PA is a regulated profession. Physician assistants are represented by the Canadian Association of Physician Assistants, which originally was formed in October 1999. As of 2023, PAs scope of practice in Canada is described at their website:

The PA's scope of practice is determined on an individual basis and formally outlined in a practice contract or agreement between the supervising physician(s), the PA and often the facility or service where the PA will work. Activities may include conducting patient interviews, histories and physical examinations; performing selected diagnostic and therapeutic interventions or procedures; and counseling patients on preventive health care.

=== Germany ===
Physician Assistants / Associates were established in Germany as a degree course in 2005. (Arztassistent). Recruitment had initially been slow, but as of 2019 there were said to be several hundred Arztassistenten in Germany.

=== Ghana ===
The practice of Clinical Officers and Physician Assistants in Ghana is regulated by the Ghana Medical and Dental Council. The Ghana Academy of Clinical Officers (GACO), established in 2025 following its rebranding from the Graduate Physician Associates of Ghana (GRAPAG), is a professional organization representing Certified Registered Clinical Officers in Ghana. GACO provides mentorship and specialized training for clinical officers.

=== India ===
The first PA program in India was established in 1992 with a focus on expanding cardiovascular specialty . Since then, multiple programs have developed (~130), most of them at baccalaureate level with four master's level programs. As on 2024, an estimated 10,000 PAs have graduated in India. With the enactment of the National Commission of Allied and Healthcare professions Act in 2021 in the Parliament, the profession is a recognised one. Physician Assistants in India are now referred to as 'Physician Associates.' Formation of a council for Allied and Healthcare professions is underway at the National level and in the different states. Efforts towards regulation of the profession, standardization of the curriculum, accreditation of training institutes etc., are also underway(As January 2025).

=== Ireland ===
Physician Associates were introduced into the Health Service Executive in the mid-2010's, following a pilot programme by the Royal College of Surgeons in Ireland which began offering a PA postgraduate degree since 2016, with 28 graduating by January 2021. PAs may not write prescriptions.

The Medical Council (the regulator for the medical profession in Ireland) issued a statement in December 2024 that it did not feel it would be the appropriate body to regulate physician associates. A moratorium on hiring new physician associates within the public health service was announced in March 2025.

=== Israel ===
Physician Assistants were introduced in Israel in May 2016 to help augment a shrinking physician workforce. The initial training programs have been overseen by the ministry of health directly, but transition to academic training is planned. Israeli PA education is modeled after United States' and Netherlands' approaches, and has focused on former paramedics with bachelor's degrees. As of 2022, the 100 or so PAs in Israel work exclusively within Emergency Departments. While PA scope of practice includes many emergency procedures, Israeli PAs are not currently allowed to prescribe or administer medicine in non-emergency settings.

=== New Zealand ===
In February 2015, Health Workforce New Zealand completed a Phase-2 trial of PAs who worked for a period of two years (2013–2015) in four clinical settings. Specifically, the sites included one rural emergency department and three primary care settings (two rural and one urban) located on the North and South Islands of New Zealand. At conclusion of the trial, several clinics continued to employ PAs while the process of health regulation makes its way through the government bureaucracy. In April 2025, the Medical Council of New Zealand announced its plan to regulate PAs. In June 2026, the Council announced that it is going to regulate PAs from October this year.

=== United Kingdom ===
Physician assistants (PAs) were introduced to the UK in 2003 with two US-trained PAs joining two GP practices in Tipton, West Midlands. Two years later, the UK Association of Physician Assistants (UKAPA) was formed as the professional body for the role. Between 2006 and 2008, the Scottish government piloted US-trained PAs in primary care, orthopaedics, emergency medicine, and intermediate care. The first large scale UK-based courses started in 2008 in Wolverhampton and Birmingham. There had previously been pilot programmes in Hertfordshire, Wolverhampton and St George's between 2004 and 2006 with cohorts in single figures. By 2011, there were only two active PA courses in the UK based at St George's and Aberdeen with a new enrolment total of 35 students. The courses based in Hertfordshire, Birmingham, and Wolverhampton had closed.

Training is through a two-year MSc or PgDip in Physician Associate Studies. As of 2025, there are 33 universities who run PA courses approved by the General Medical Council (GMC). Four of which have approval with conditions. By June 2026, 22 PA courses had either been suspended or closed following the Leng Review.

The UKAPA voted to change the profession's name to "physician associate" in 2013 after being advised by the then government that being "assistants" would limit their ability to be regulated. In the UK, PAs are a dependent profession and must be under the supervision of a named senior doctor. They are legally not allowed to prescribe medications or request ionising radiation. There is no nationally agreed scope of practice for PAs in the UK. A number of organisations have suggested scopes of practices including the British Medical Association (BMA), RCGP, and the RCP. The High Court of Justice stated that PAs could be considered "medical professionals" and have similar standards placed on them as doctors but clarified that PAs were "not medically qualified" after a judicial review requested by the BMA in April 2025.

Initial expansion of the PA workforce was slow with around 200 on the Faculty of Physician Associates (FPA) voluntary register by 2015. Hillingdon Hospitals NHS Foundation Trust was asked to manage the recruitment of 200 US-trained physician associates in September 2015. From 2016, there was a rapid expansion of the PA workforce due to government policy led by Secretary of State for Health and Social Care Jeremy Hunt, support from royal colleges and NHS England. The lattermost aspired for 10,000 PAs by 2036/2037 as part of their 2023 Long Term Workforce Plan. From 2016, there was a large increase in PA courses with a further 16 opening between 2017 and 2024. By October 2022, there were an estimated 3,240 PAs working in the UK based on the FPA voluntary register. This had increased to 5,092 by December 2024. The Royal College of General Practitioners (RCGP) in September 2024 reversed their previous support for PAs and opposed their role in primary care. The Royal College of Physicians (RCP) of London called for the renaming of the role back to "physician assistant" and a clear national scope of practice for PAs in March 2025. The RCP's policy reversal was a result of the fallout of a contentious extraordinary general meeting (EGM) on PAs in March 2024 which had led to the resignation of its president, registrar, deputy registrar, and chief executive. At the RCP EGM, fellows voted to limit the pace and scale of the roll-out of PA workforce which had been opposed by the RCP executive team at the time. The executive team had also misrepresented survey data to fellows on the impact of PAs.

The GMC became the regulator of PAs in December 2024. In order to apply for registration the PA must pass both parts of the physician associate registration assessment. PAs were given a deadline of December 2026 to register with the GMC before it becomes a mandatory requirement to work in the UK. By 12 June 2026, 4,236 PAs had joined the register.

==== The Leng Review ====
The UK government announced an independent review led by Gillian Leng, the former chief executive of the National Institute for Health and Care Excellence and president of the Royal Society of Medicine, into the safety and effectiveness of PA and AA roles in healthcare in November 2024 with findings published in July 2025. It found "no good evidence" that the role was safe or effective, nor unsafe or ineffective, and could not justify abolishing the role. The Leng Review commented that PAs had been used in hospitals and GP practices as "substitutes for doctors". It recommended that PAs should not see undifferentiated patients, should be renamed as "physician assistants", wear distinct uniforms to differentiate them from doctors, and should work for two years post graduation in hospitals before being able to work in mental health or primary care. Other recommendations included formalising supervision arrangements, establishing a national scope of practice, and creating frameworks for career development and advanced practice roles under close supervision. Wes Streeting, Secretary of State for Health and Social Care, who had requested the review accepted all its recommendations. NHS Employers, the organisation which represents employers in the NHS, accepted the findings of the review. They advised employers to immediately refer to PAs as "physician assistants", ensure that PAs do not triage or see undifferentiated patients in any setting, that all PAs in primary care should have had at least two years employment in secondary care prior to starting, that new PAs' role should follow the template job description described in the review, and current PAs' role should be reviewed by their supervisors and modified as necessary.

By May 2026, the number of PAs employed in primary care networks in England had declined by 17% from a peak of 1,184 in June 2024 to 979.

The Welsh Government accepted the recommendations of the review in September 2025 and advised employers to update terminology accordingly prior to the UK government legally changing the role's name. In May 2026, Health Education and Improvement Wales announced that they would no longer commission education for student PAs and that there would be a pause on recruitment in Wales.

==== Faculty of Physician Associates ====
The Faculty of Physician Associates (FPA) was the professional body for physician associates working in the UK between July 2015 and December 2024. It was established as a faculty of the RCP of London and succeeded its predecessor organisation, the UK Association of Physician Assistants (UKAPA), which had been formed in 2005. The FPA oversaw the Physician Associate Managed Voluntary Register, which all practising associates were encouraged to join, and set and ran the National Assessment Examination and National Recertification Examination. PAs were required to pass the recertification exam every six years to remain on the PAMVR until 2023 when the exams were scrapped to prepare for the GMC to become their regulator in 2024. The FPA closed in December 2024 following an extraordinary general meeting on PAs at the RCP in March 2024, where fellows voted to limit the pace and scale of the roll-out of the PA workforce.

=== United States ===
==== Nomenclature (US) ====
In accordance with the American Academy of Physician Associates (AAPA), the official title of the profession in the United States is "Physician Associate". While this is the official title used by the national organization, utilization of this title may vary on the state and local level based on state and local bylaws and policies. Many hospital and healthcare systems still use physician assistant as titles, with some just resorting to using "PA" to avoid confusion with physicians.

A physician assistant may use the initials "PA", "PA-C", "APA-C", "RPA" or "RPA-C", where the "-C" indicates "Certified" and the "R" indicates "Registered". The "R" designation is unique to a few states, mainly in the Northeast. APA stands for aeromedical physician assistant and indicates that a physician assistant successfully completed the US Army Flight Surgeon Primary Course. During training, PA students are designated PA-S. The use of "PA-C" is limited to certified PAs who comply with the regulations of the National Commission on Certification of Physician Assistants and who have passed PANCE.

Students undertaking physician assistant or associate training may refer to themselves as a physician assistant student, physician associate student, student physician assistant or student physician associate. PA students may add "S" at the end of their student designation (PA-S). Students may also use the corresponding year of their training in their student designation. For example, students in the second year of their physician assistant or physician associate training may use (PA-S2) as their student designation.

The American Academy of Physician Associates has spent over $22 million since 2018 campaigning to change the word "assistant" to "associate" in the title of physician assistant. The campaign has been heavily criticized by physicians, but advocates argue that the revised title more accurately reflects the clinician's role on the patient care team.

In the United States, the profession is represented by the American Academy of Physician Associates. All PAs must graduate from a nationally accredited ARC-PA program as well as passing the national certification exam. In 1970 the American Medical Association passed a resolution to develop educational guidelines and certification procedures for PAs. The Duke University Medical Center Archives had established the Physician Assistant History Center, dedicated to the study, preservation, and presentation of the history of the profession. The PA History Center became its own institution in 2011, was renamed the PA History Society, and relocated to Johns Creek, Georgia.

==== Education and certification (US) ====
As of May 2019, 243 accredited PA programs operated in the United States, with dozens more in development. Most educational programs are graduate programs leading to the award of master's degrees in either Physician Assistant Studies, Health Science (Master of Health Science), or Medical Science (MMSc), and require a bachelor's degree and Graduate Record Examination or Medical College Admission Test scores for entry. The majority of PA programs in the United States employ the CASPA application for selecting students. Professional licensure is regulated by state medical boards. PA students train at medical schools and academic medical centers across the country.

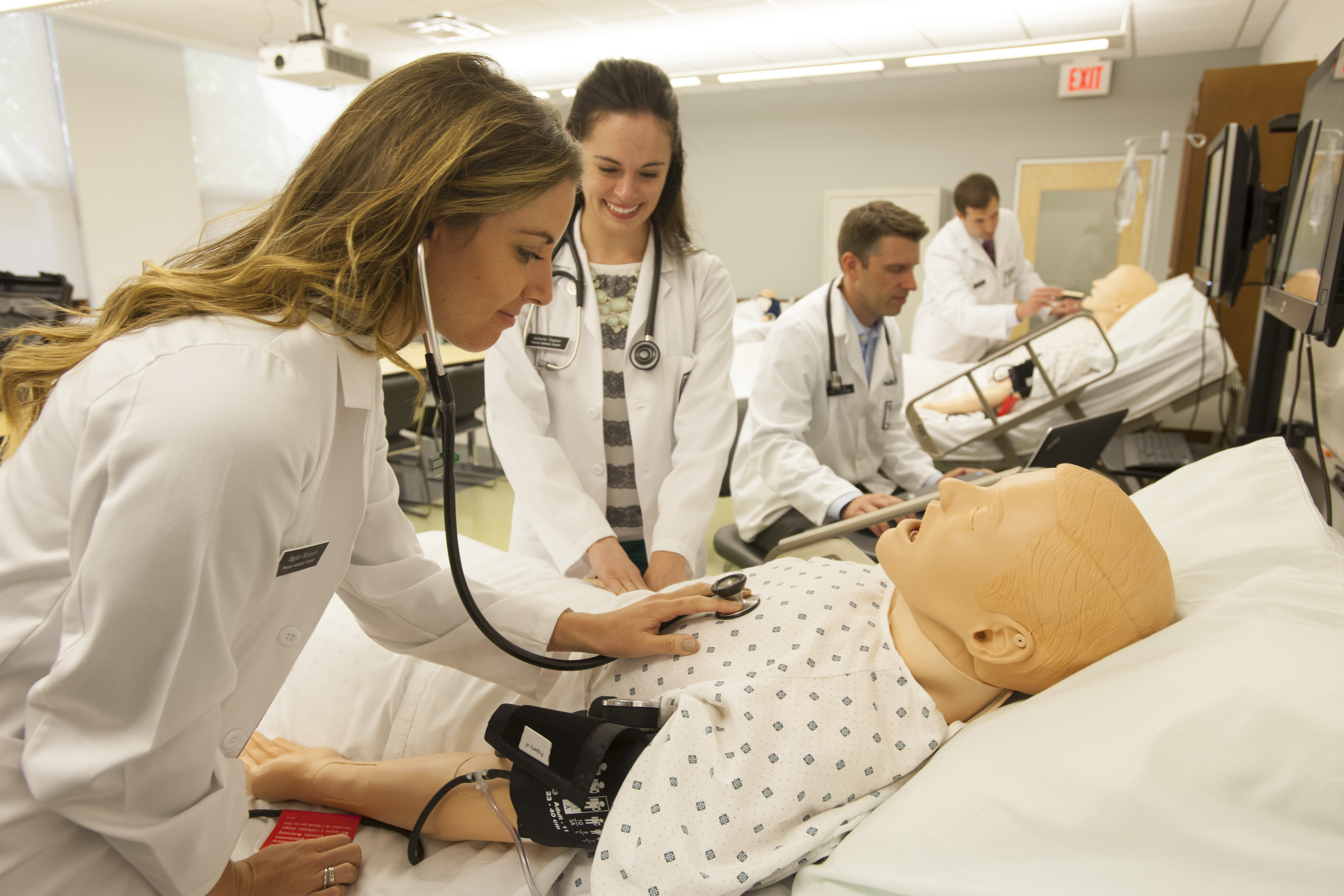
Physician Assistant Program at ODU

PA education is based on medical education; it typically requires 2 to 3 years of full-time graduate study like most master's degrees. (Medical school lasts four years plus a specialty-specific residency.) Training consists of classroom and laboratory instruction in medical and behavioral sciences, followed by clinical rotations in internal medicine, family medicine, surgery, pediatrics, obstetrics and gynecology, emergency medicine, and geriatric medicine, as well as elective rotations. PAs are not required to complete residencies after they complete their schooling (unlike physicians). Postgraduate training programs are offered in certain specialties for PAs, though these are optional and shorter in length than medical residency.

PA clinical postgraduate programs are clinical training programs that differ from on the job training given their inclusion of education and supervised clinical experience to meet learning objectives. Montefiore Medical Center Postgraduate Surgical Physician Assistant Program was established in 1971 as the first recognized clinical postgraduate PA program. 49 programs address specialties such as Neurology, Trauma/Critical Care and Oncology. 50 programs joined the Association of Postgraduate Physician Assistant Programs to establish educational standards for postgraduate PA programs.

In the United States, a graduate from an accredited PA program must pass the NCCPA-administered Physician Assistant National Certifying Exam (PANCE) before becoming a PA-C; this certification is required for licensure in all states. The content of the exam is covered in the PANCE BLUEPRINT. In addition, a PA must log 100 Continuing Medical Education hours and reregister his or her certificate with the NCCPA every two years. Every ten years (formerly six years), a PA must also recertify by successfully completing the Physician Assistant National Recertifying Exam (PANRE) There is a growing number of doctoral programs for certified PAs leading to a Doctor of Medical Science (DMSc) but there is no requirement for one to have a doctorate in order to practice. "National Physician Assistant Week" is celebrated annually in the US from October 6 through October 12. This week was chosen to commemorate the anniversary of the first graduating physician assistant class at Duke University on October 6, 1967. October 6 is also the birthday of the profession's founder, Eugene A. Stead Jr., MD.

==== Scope of practice (US) ====
Physician assistants have their own licenses with distinct scope of practice. Each of the 50 states has different laws regarding the prescription of medications by PAs and the licensing authority granted to each category within that particular state through the Drug Enforcement Administration (DEA). PAs in Kentucky and Puerto Rico are not allowed to prescribe any controlled substances. Several other states place a limit on the type of controlled substance or the quantity that can be prescribed, dispensed, or administered by a PA. Depending upon the specific laws of any given state board of medicine, the PA must have a formal relationship on file with a collaborative physician. The collaborating physician must also be licensed in the state in which the PA is working, although he or she may physically be located elsewhere. Physician collaboration can be in person, by telecommunication systems or by other reliable means (for example, availability for consultation). In emergency departments the laws governing PA practice differ by state, generally allowing a broad scope of practice and limited direct supervision.

During the COVID-19 pandemic, several state governments changed regulations regarding PA scope of practice, including:

- On May 21, 2020, the law S.B. 1915 was signed by Oklahoma Governor Kevin Stitt. This law allows Physician Assistants to become primary care providers and receive direct pay from insurers. The reference of "supervision" was changed to "delegating" in regards to physician responsibility. This law also allows PAs to legally volunteer in the case of disaster or emergency.
- On May 27, 2020, Governor Tim Walz signed into Minnesota law the Omnibus Healthcare Bill S.F. 13. This law removes references to physician responsibility of supervision and delegation of care provided by PAs. The law also removes delegated prescriptive authority.

==== Employment (US) ====
The first employer of PAs was the then-Veterans Administration, known today as the Department of Veterans Affairs. Today it is the largest single employer of PAs, employing nearly 2,000.

According to the AAPA, as of 2020 there are more than 148,560 certified PAs in the United States, up from 115,547 in 2016.

Money magazine, in conjunction with Salary.com, listed the PA profession as the "fifth best job in America" in May 2006, based both on salary and job prospects, and on an anticipated 10-year job growth of 49.65%. In 2010, CNN Money rated the physician assistant career as the number two best job in America. In 2012, Forbes rated the physician assistant degree as the number one master's degree for jobs. In 2015, Glassdoor rated physician assistant as the number one best job in America. In 2021, U.S. News & World Report rated physician assistant as the number one best job in America.

The US Department of Labor Bureau of Labor Statistics report on PAs states, "...Employment of physician assistants is projected to grow 37 percent from 2016 to 2026, much faster than the average for all occupations..." This is due to several factors, including an expanding health care industry, an aging baby-boomer population, concerns for cost containment, and newly implemented restrictions to shorten physician resident work hours.

In the 2008 AAPA census, 56 percent of responding PAs worked in physicians' offices or clinics and 24 percent were employed by hospitals. The remainder were employed in public health clinics, nursing homes, schools, prisons, home health care agencies, and the United States Department of Veterans Affairs Fifteen percent of responding PAs work in counties classified as non-metropolitan by Economic Research Service of the United States Department of Agriculture; approximately 17% of the US population resides in these counties.

For PAs in primary care practice, malpractice insurance policies with $100,000–300,000 in coverage can cost less than $600 per year; premiums are higher for PAs in higher-risk specialties.

==== Compensation (US) ====
According to Bureau of Labor Statistics, in 2020 the median pay for physician assistants working full-time was $115,390 per year or $55.48 per hour, and the highest 10 percent earned more than $162,470. Physician assistants in emergency medicine, dermatology, and surgical subspecialties may earn up to $200,000 per year.

==== Federal government, uniformed services, and US armed forces (US) ====
PAs are employed by the United States Department of State as foreign service health practitioners. PAs working in this capacity may be deployed anywhere in the world where there is a State Department facility. They provide primary care to US government employees and their families in American embassies and consulates around the world. An important part of their jobs is to get to know what resources are available locally that they can count on in an emergency. They have other important roles, such as advising their ambassadors on the health situation in the country and provide health education to the diplomatic community. In order to be considered for the position, these PAs must be licensed and have at least two years of recent experience in primary care.

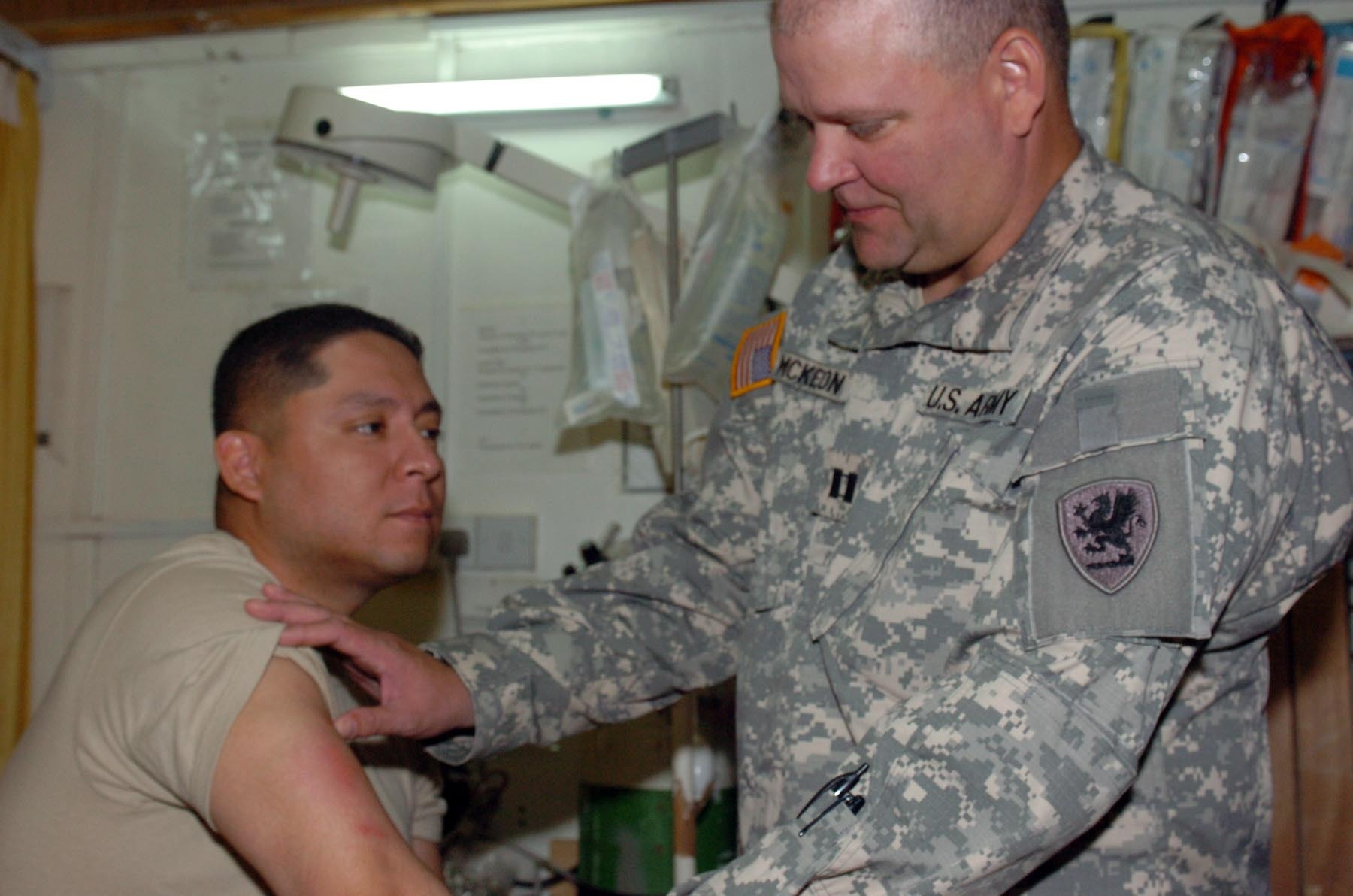
Physician Assistant in the US Army

Military PAs serve in the White House Medical Unit, where they provide care to the president and vice president and their families as well as White House staff.

They are employed by several organizations with the intelligence community, specifically the Central Intelligence Agency. While much of the job description is classified, they work under the Directorate of Support and are deployed to "austere environments" where they provide medical care, including trauma stabilization, and teach in the fields of survival, field medicine, and tactical combat casualty care.

United States Army PAs serve as Medical Specialist Corps officers, typically within Army combat or combat support battalions located in the continental United States, Alaska, Hawaii, and overseas. These include infantry, armor, cavalry, airborne, artillery, and (if the PA qualifies) special forces units. They serve as the "front line" of Army medicine and along with combat medics are responsible for the total health care of soldiers assigned to their unit, as well as of their family members.

PAs also serve in the Air Force and Navy as clinical practitioners and aviation medicine specialists, as well as in the Coast Guard and Public Health Service. The skills required for these PAs are similar to that of their civilian colleagues, but additional training is provided in advanced casualty care, medical management of chemical injuries, aviation medicine, and military medicine. In addition, military PAs are also required to meet the officer commissioning requirements, and maintain the professional and physical readiness standards of their respective services.

The marine physician assistant is a US Merchant Marine staff officer. A certificate of registry is granted through The United States Coast Guard National Maritime Center located in Martinsburg, West Virginia. Formal training programs for marine physician assistants began in September, 1966 at the Public Service Health Hospital located in Staten Island, N.Y.

=== South Korea ===
On 28 August 2024, the National Assembly passed a bill that would authorize some nurses to aid physicians: "The bill, which authorizes physician assistant nurses to support physicians during surgery and handle some duties presently reserved for doctors."

== Global development ==
The PA profession has grown worldwide in the past 20 years. There are now programs in over 15 countries, including Canada, the Netherlands, Australia, and Ghana, among others, which have implemented the PA model to meet local needs for healthcare providers. The expansion of PA programs into Asia and Africa continues, as the role adapts to fit a variety of healthcare systems.
