= Bachelor of Medicine, Bachelor of Surgery =

Medical and surgical degree

A Bachelor of Medicine, Bachelor of Surgery (Latin: Medicinae Baccalaureus, Baccalaureus Chirurgiae; MBBS, also abbreviated as BM BS, MB ChB, MB BCh, MB BS, or MB BChir) is a medical degree granted by medical schools in countries that adhere to the United Kingdom's higher education tradition. These degrees are typically combined and conferred together. This degree is usually awarded as an undergraduate degree, but it can also be awarded at graduate-level medical institutions. The typical duration for completion is five to six years. In some cases, students with relevant undergraduate degrees can join an accelerated program and complete a four-year MBBS programme. It is widely regarded as one of the most prestigious and respected degrees in the world.

A Bachelor of Medicine (BMed or MB) is an undergraduate medical degree awarded by medical schools in countries following the tradition of China. The completion period for this degree is generally five to six years. The term "medicine" encompasses the broader field of medical science and practice. Consequently, graduates with a BMed degree are qualified to practice surgery. The BMed degree serves as the primary medical qualification, and individuals holding it may pursue further professional education, such as a Master of Medical Science or a Doctor of Medical Science (equivalent to a PhD).

Both degrees are considered equivalent to the Doctor of Medicine degree typically conferred by universities in North America. Doctors trained in some osteopathic medicine programs receive the Doctor of Osteopathic Medicine degree. MBBS, BMed, MD and DO degrees are considered to be equivalent.

== History and nature ==
The degree is currently awarded in institutions in the United Kingdom and countries formerly part of the British Empire.

Historically, Bachelor of Medicine was also the primary medical degree conferred by institutions in the United States and Canada, such as the University of Pennsylvania, Harvard University, the University of Toronto, the University of Maryland, Baltimore, and Columbia University. Several early North American medical schools were (for the most part) founded by physicians and surgeons who had trained in England and Scotland. University medical education in England culminated with the Bachelor of Medicine qualification and in Scotland the Doctor of Medicine. In the mid-19th century, the public bodies that regulated medical practice required practitioners in Scotland and England to hold the dual Bachelor of Medicine and Bachelor of Surgery degrees. Over the course of the 19th century, North American medical schools switched to the tradition of the ancient universities of Scotland and began conferring Doctor of Medicine rather than Bachelor of Medicine.

In the countries that award bachelor's degrees in medicine, however, Doctor of Medicine denotes a holder of a junior doctorate and is reserved for medical practitioners who undertake research and submit a thesis in the field of medicine. Nevertheless, those holding Bachelor of Medicine, Bachelor of Surgery are usually referred to by the courtesy title of "Doctor" and use the prefix "Dr.", whether or not they also hold a Ph.D. or DSc.

In many countries, the degrees are awarded after an undergraduate course lasting five or six years. For example, most Chinese universities offering medical degrees provide undergraduate courses lasting six years. In some cases, a graduate in another discipline may subsequently enter a special graduate-entry medical course, reduced in duration to account for relevant material covered or learning skills acquired during the first degree. In some cases the old first-year courses (for six-year degrees) in the basic sciences of physics, chemistry, and biology have been abolished: that standard has to be reached by school examinations before entry. However, in most countries, a newly graduated Bachelor of Medicine and Surgery must spend a specified period in internship before he or she can obtain full registration as a licensed medical practitioner.

== Naming ==
The names and abbreviations given to these degrees depend on the institution, awarding body or country, and vary widely. This is mostly for reasons of tradition rather than to indicate any difference between the relative levels of the degrees. They are considered equivalent.

If the awarding body titles the degrees in Latin, the degrees are commonly named Medicinae Baccalaureus, Chirurgiae Baccalaureus; Medicinae Baccalaureus et Chirurgiae Baccalaureus; or Baccalaureus in Medicina et in Chirurgia; abbreviated as MB ChB, MB BCh or otherwise. If titled in English, they are named Bachelor of Medicine, Bachelor of Surgery; Bachelor of Medicine and Bachelor of Surgery; or Bachelor of Medicine and Surgery; usually abbreviated as MB BS, and sometimes as BM BS, even though most MB BS-awarding institutions do not use Latin to name their degrees.

Below are described the specific names used, arranged by country.

=== Australia ===
Historically, Australian medical schools have followed the British tradition by conferring the degrees of Bachelor of Medicine and Bachelor of Surgery (MBBS) to its graduates whilst reserving the title of Doctor of Medicine (MD) for their research training degree, analogous to the PhD, or for their honorary doctorates. Although the majority of Australian MBBS degrees have been graduate programs since the 1990s, under the previous Australian Qualifications Framework (AQF) they remained categorised as Level 7 Bachelor's degrees together with other undergraduate programs.

The latest version of the AQF includes the new category of Level 9 Master's (Extended) degrees which permits the use of the term 'Doctor' in the styling of the degree title of relevant professional programs. As a result, most undergraduate Australian medical schools have replaced their MBBS degrees with a combined degree that ends with the MD (e.g. the Bachelor of Medical Studies / Doctor of Medicine at The University of New South Wales or the Bachelor of Medical Science and Doctor of Medicine at Monash University) or switched to graduate only MD pathways, to resolve the previous anomalous nomenclature. Even still, Curtin University and James Cook University both still offer the MBBS degree. With the introduction of the Master's level MD, universities have also renamed their previous medical research doctorates. The University of Melbourne was the first to introduce the MD in 2011 as a basic medical degree, and has renamed its research degree to Doctor of Medical Science (DMedSc).

=== Bahrain ===
The Medical University of Bahrain or RCSI-Bahrain is a constituent university of the Royal College of Surgeons in Ireland (RCSI) and awards its graduates the MB, BCh, BAO (Hons), the same degree awarded to graduates at RCSI.

=== Bangladesh ===
All medical schools in Bangladesh award MBBS.

=== Barbados ===
The Bridgetown International University, Victoria University of Barbados, American University of Barbados School of Medicine, and University of the West Indies Faculty of Medicine all award the MBBS.

=== China ===
In China, medical undergraduates are awarded a Bachelor of Medicine (MB, also BMed, and BM) in Clinical Medicine for a course of study lasting five years for native Chinese students and six years for international/foreign students, including internship. International students may take the program in English or Chinese. Some medical schools also award MBBS degrees, but only for the international students. In total, 247 universities are authorized to award medical degrees. All 247 universities are recognized by most of the medical councils around the world and by ECFMG. By August 2022, 136 universities have passed the process of Accreditation of Medical Education from the Ministry of Education of China. The universities awarding MB and MBBS degrees are at the list of medical schools in China.

=== Egypt ===
All Egyptian medical schools, public and private, award an MB BCh as the basic medical degree after completion of five academic and clinical study years followed by two years of obligatory clinical rotations (the MB BCh is issued only after the completion of the clinical rotations) with total of seven years both academic, clinical study and clinical rotations.

=== Ghana ===
All Ghanaian medical schools award an MBChB as the basic medical degree after 6 academic years. These seven medical schools are Kwame Nkrumah University of Science and Technology, University of Ghana, University for Development Studies, University of Cape Coast, University of Health and Allied Sciences and the private Accra College of Medicine, and Family Health Medical School, another private medical school.

=== Guyana ===
The University of Guyana awards MB BS. Other "offshore" United-States-linked schools in the country award the North American MD, such as Texila American University, Lincoln American University.

=== Hong Kong ===
The awarding of qualifications in Hong Kong follows the British tradition.

The dual degree is awarded as:

- MBBS at the University of Hong Kong
- MBChB at the Chinese University of Hong Kong

=== India ===
In India, the MBBS is a 5.5-year undergraduate medical degree that includes 4.5 years of academic coursework followed by a one-year compulsory rotating medical internship. In some Indian states, an additional rural service period is mandated before permanent medical registration, although institutions like the All India Institutes of Medical Sciences (AIIMS), Jawaharlal Institute of Postgraduate Medical Education and Research and certain deemed universities may be exempt from this requirement. During the internship, students receive a government-approved stipend. Full registration to practice medicine is granted upon completion of all academic, clinical, and internship components.

The MBBS degree in India falls under the regulatory oversight of the National Medical Commission (NMC), which is responsible for the accreditation and monitoring of medical colleges and their curriculum.

As of August 2025, there are 780 medical colleges in India recognized by the NMC to offer MBBS programs, with a total intake of 118,148 seats.

Admission to MBBS programs in India is determined through a national-level entrance examination known as the National Eligibility cum Entrance Test (Undergraduate) (NEET-UG). As of June 2026, there are 118,148 MBBS seats available across 780 recognized medical colleges in the country. Government medical colleges are especially competitive due to subsidized tuition and high patient inflow at affiliated teaching hospitals, which provide students with extensive clinical exposure.

The MBBS curriculum in India includes foundational pre-clinical and para-clinical subjects such as anatomy, physiology, biochemistry, pathology, microbiology, forensic medicine, and pharmacology. These are complemented by concurrent clinical training in outpatient and inpatient hospital settings, where students develop competencies in patient history-taking, physical examination, differential diagnosis, clinical decision-making, and basic medical procedures.

The final phase of the MBBS program is a 12-month compulsory rotatory internship, during which students are posted across departments such as internal medicine, general surgery, paediatrics, obstetrics and gynaecology, and community medicine. The internship provides hands-on clinical experience under supervision and also includes exposure to hospital administration, interprofessional collaboration, and patient communication.

In June 2023, the Government of India announced the implementation of the National Exit Test (NExT) as a standardized examination for MBBS graduates. The NExT will serve as both a licensure exam for medical practice and a qualifying examination for admission to postgraduate medical courses, effectively replacing the traditional final-year university examinations.

=== Indonesia ===
In Indonesia, graduating students are awarded the academic degree of Sarjana Kedokteran / Bachelor of Medicine (written as suffix "S.Ked.") after completing their pre-clinical studies. At this point, the graduate is not yet a practising doctor, but may choose to work directly as a medical scientist or other non-clinician professions (usually health-related). However, most graduates will pursue the conventional path, which is to enroll in the clinical clerkship program (Program Pendidikan Profesi Dokter) for another 1.5 to 2 years. During this program, students are required to rotate through different medical/surgical specialties in a teaching hospital, actively involved in diagnoses and treatment of patients under the direct supervision of residents and consultants/attending physicians. After completing a clinical clerkship, students take the national medical licensing examination (Ujian Kompetensi Mahasiswa Program Profesi Dokter/UKMPPD) and will be awarded the title Dokter (written as prefix "dr.") as their first professional title if they pass the examination.

=== Iraq ===
All medical schools in Iraq award MB ChB, with the exception of the University of Kurdistan-Hewlêr which awards the MBBS degree.

=== Ireland ===
The medical schools in both the Republic of Ireland and Northern Ireland – Queen's University Belfast, Trinity College Dublin, some constituent institutions of the National University of Ireland (University College Dublin, University College Cork and University of Galway), and the Royal College of Surgeons in Ireland — award the degrees of MB BCh BAO. The letters BAO stand for Baccalaureus in Arte Obstetricia (Bachelor of Obstetrics), a degree unique to Ireland which the Irish universities added in the 19th century as the legislation at the time insisted on a final examination in obstetrics. This third degree is not registerable with the Irish Medical Council nor the British General Medical Council (GMC). The only exception is the newly established University of Limerick graduate entry school of medicine which awards BM BS for Bachelor of Medicine and Bachelor of Surgery.

At Trinity College Dublin, the preclinical course leads to an additional Bachelor of Arts (BA) degree (upgradable after three or four years to Master of Arts); as originally after this most students used to go elsewhere to complete clinical training.

LRCPI LRCSI, or simply LRCP&SI, denotes a holder of the historical non-university qualifying licentiates awarded jointly by the Royal College of Physicians of Ireland and the Royal College of Surgeons in Ireland to students of the RCSI's medical school under the Irish Conjoint Scheme. Unlike the corresponding licentiates awarded by the Royal Colleges in Scotland and England (which were external qualifications), these qualifications are still registerable with the Irish Medical Council, but not with the British GMC. Students at RCSI still receive these licences but now also receive the degrees MB BCh BAO, due to RCSI's status as a recognised college of the National University of Ireland. The RCSI students received a Licence in Midwifery (LM) from each college, in the same way that the Irish universities granted BAO degrees, so their qualifications were sometimes expressed as L & LM, RCPI, L & LM, RCSI or more misleadingly as LLM, LRCPI LRCSI, or simply LRCP&SI.

LAH denotes a licentiate of the Apothecaries' Hall of Ireland, which remains a registrable qualification with both the GMC and the Irish Medical Council, but not as a primary qualification and it is now only awarded to otherwise qualified doctors.

=== Japan ===
In Japan, medical undergraduates are awarded a Bachelor of Medicine, a course of study lasting six years. It is awarded by 42 national, 8 public and 31 private universities.

=== Jordan ===
The Bachelor of Medicine and Surgery (MBBS) degree is awarded in Jordan.

=== Kenya ===
The national universities with medical faculties in Kenya, namely Jomo Kenyatta University of Agriculture and Technology, University of Nairobi, Aga Khan University, Moi University, Kenyatta University, Egerton University, Maseno University and Kenya Methodist University award MB ChB.

Mount Kenya University and Egerton University also award the four-year BSc. Clinical Medicine degree in addition to the six-year MBChB.

=== Libya ===
There are three major public medical universities in Libya, University of Tripoli (Tripoli), University of Benghazi (formerly Garyounis) (Benghazi), and University of Alzaweyah. The schools award the MBBCh.

The Libyan International Medical University is an accredited private medical university that awards an MBChB to its graduates.

=== Malaysia ===
The MBBS is awarded by five public and 17 private universities.

=== Myanmar ===
Myanmar medical schools have followed the British tradition by conferring MBBS degrees to its graduates. In Myanmar the first MBBS was offered at the University of Medicine 1 in Yangon between 1923–1924. It established the government medical school in 1907 and offered a four-year medical course known as the Licentiate Medical Practise (LMP) course and the successful candidates were offered certificate of license for medical practise. In 1923 the Bachelor of Medicine and Bachelor of Surgery course was introduced. In 1937, the medical degree, MBBS (Rgn), conferred by the University of Yangon gained recognition by the British General Medical Council.

The MSc programme in Anatomy began in 1971, and the degree title was changed to M.Med.Sc (Anatomy) in 1977. According to the Faculty's records, M.Med.Sc programmes in clinical and basic science departments, such as Internal Medicine, Surgery, Physiology, Pharmacology and Pediatrics, were inaugurated in various years, beginning from 1971 (Anatomy, Internal Medicine, Surgery, Obstetrics and Gynecology) and expanding through the 1990s (Biochemistry in 1993; Pathology, Anaesthesia, Microbiology and Radiology in early 1990s).

The PhD in medicine programmes in basic medical sciences commenced in 1997 (Anatomy, Physiology, Microbiology, Pharmacology and Pathology) and 1998–1999 (Biochemistry in 1998 and Public Health in 1999), with the first Ph.D. graduates appearing in those years.

The Bachelor of Medicine and Bachelor of Surgery (MBBS) program has traditionally been a seven-year course comprising the Foundation Year, Medical year 1 through 5 and House Surgeon training, however, the MBBS program is planned to be restructured into a six-year curriculum over the 2025–2026 academic year.

Nowadays, seven medical schools (UM1, UM 2, DSMA, UMM, UMMG, UMTGI and NSA) in Myanmar award the MBBS. The Defence Services Medical Academy also award the MBBS for members of the military.

=== Namibia ===
The University of Namibia UNAM School of Medicine, the only medical school in the country, awards the MBChB degree.

=== Nepal ===
There are 18 medical schools in Nepal that award the MBBS degree. Medical education commission, Nepal (MEC) organizes the work related to establishment and operation of medical institutions all over Nepal and bears the sole responsibility to maintain quality, professionalism, institutional accountability and social justice in medical education. There is another entity called Nepal Medical Council (NMC) which major functions are quality control of medical education of the country, establish ethical health care practice, establish standardization of medical practice as well as responsible for giving license to practise medicine within the country's border.

=== Netherlands ===
In the Netherlands, students follow a period of 6 academic years. After three years, students obtain the title Bachelor Geneeskunde (translates to Bachelor of Medicine). After a further three years of study and internships, students obtain the Master Geneeskunde (translates to Master of Medicine) title. After the completion of the master's degree, the students are recognized as medical doctors.

=== New Zealand ===
The two New Zealand medical schools, the University of Auckland and the University of Otago, style their degrees as "MBChB" and "MB ChB" respectively.

=== Nigeria ===
The MBBS/MB ChB is awarded by many public and private universities in Nigeria, after a period of 6 academic years.

=== Pakistan ===
In Pakistan, a medical school is more often referred to as a medical college. It is a 5-year course plus one-year internship in affiliated hospital that can be completed from a college recognized by the Pakistan Medical and Dental Council (PMDC). Medical colleges may also teach Post Graduate courses such as FCPS and diplomas. A medical college is affiliated with a university as a department which usually has a separate campus.

=== Rwanda ===
All Rwandan medical schools, public and private, award an MBBS as the basic medical degree after completion of five or six academic years.

=== Saudi Arabia ===
Medical schools in Saudi Arabia award the MBBS.

=== Singapore ===
The Yong Loo Lin School of Medicine at the National University of Singapore and the Lee Kong Chian School of Medicine at Nanyang Technological University confer MB BS. The American Duke University has a medical programme based in Singapore (Duke-NUS Graduate Medical School), but it follows the North American model of styling its degree Doctor of Medicine (MD) at master's degree level.

=== Somalia ===
Somali National University, Amoud University, Benadir University Salaam University and Hargeisa University award the MB ChB, East Africa University awards MMBS.

=== South Africa ===
The University of Pretoria, University of Cape Town, University of the Free State, University of Stellenbosch, University of KwaZulu-Natal, Walter Sisulu University and MEDUNSA all award MBChB, whereas the University of the Witwatersrand styles its degree as MBBCh.

=== South Sudan ===
The University of Juba, University of Bahr El-Ghazal and Upper Nile University in South Sudan awards the MBBS degree after the successful completion of six academic years.

=== Sri Lanka ===
In 1942, the University of Ceylon was established through legislation and the MBBS degree was recognised for registration of doctors in place of the Licentiate in Medicine and Surgery (LMS).

=== Sudan ===
The medical degree in Sudan is a six-year program that includes both classroom and clinical training. Students who successfully complete the program are awarded the Bachelor of Medicine, Bachelor of Surgery (MBBS) degree, which is recognized internationally.

=== Syria ===
The higher education in Syria provides training to a Diploma, Bachelor, Master, and Doctorate levels (see European Education, Audiovisual and Culture Executive Agency on Higher Education: Syria).

=== Tunisia ===
Medical education in Tunisia is solely administered by the government Ministry of Higher Education and Ministry of Public Health. Students get permitted access to medical studies when succeeding their national baccalauréat exam and obtaining a competitive score that allows them admission to medical schools (usually in the 95% percentile). The curriculum spans six years, two years of fundamental medicine, followed by three years of clinical medicine, culminating in a final year of internship. Upon the completion of this comprehensive training, students are awarded a certificate equivalent to a bachelor's degree, known as the "Diplome de Fin des Etudes Cliniques en Médecine." Subsequently, a national exam is undertaken, and students are ranked based on their performance. Specialization in medicine then follows, ranging from an additional three years for family medicine to five years for most medical and surgical specialties.

During the initial two years at medical school, students focus on foundational subjects such as physiology, semiology, and the fundamentals of medical examination. From the fourth year onwards, they engage in rotations at teaching hospitals, where they actively participate under the guidance of junior and senior physicians, honing their practical skills. At the conclusion of the fifth year, students undergo a competitive examination to determine their medical specialty and city of practice. Following this, they transition to full-time physicians, practising under supervision, and earn the title of "doctors" upon successful completion of their residency.

=== Uganda ===
The nine universities in Uganda that have medical schools that teach undergraduate courses, namely; Makerere University, Mbarara University, Gulu University, Kampala International University, Busitema University, Kabale University, Habib Medical School, St. Augustine International University, and Uganda Christian University all award the MBChB degree, after five years of study.

=== Ukraine ===
In Ukraine, the full-form of MBBS is Bachelor of Medicine and Bachelor of Surgery. It is generally a 5.8 year course including one year compulsory internship, that can be completed from a college accredited by the National Medical Commission. At present, Ukraine is ranked at the fourth position in Europe for having the largest number of post graduates in fields of medicine. Ukraine has a number of Top Government Medical Universities offering MBBS, MD and other degrees in medicine to the local students as well as international students.

The MBBS course starts with the basic pre and para-clinical subjects such as biochemistry, physiology, anatomy, microbiology, pathology, forensic medicine including toxicology and pharmacology. The students simultaneously obtain hands-on training in the wards and out-patient departments, where they interact with real patients for six years. The curriculum aims to inculcate standard protocols of history taking, examination, differential diagnosis and complete patient Management. The student is taught to determine what investigations will be useful for a patient and what are the best treatment options. The curriculum also contains a thorough practical knowledge and practice of performing standard clinical procedures. The course also contains a 12-month-long internship, in which an intern is rotated across various specialties. Besides standard clinical care, one also gets a thorough experience of ward management, staff management, and thorough counselling skills. The degree awarded is "Bachelor of Medicine and Bachelor of Surgery". The minimum requirements for the MBBS course are 50% marks in physics, chemistry, biology and English in a student's secondary school examinations and student need to pass National Eligibility cum Entrance Test examination for the admission in Ukraine Universities.

=== United Kingdom ===
==== England, Wales, and Northern Ireland ====
While first degrees in medicine meet the expectations of the descriptor for higher education qualification at "level 7 (the UK master's degree)", these degrees usually retain, for historical reasons, "Bachelor of Medicine, Bachelor of Surgery" and are abbreviated to MBChB or MBBS.

Varied abbreviations are used for these degrees in these areas:

- MB ChB is used at the universities of Aston, Anglia Ruskin, Birmingham, Bristol, Buckingham, Lancaster, Leeds, Leicester, Liverpool, Keele, Manchester, Sheffield, Sunderland (in partnership with Keele) and Warwick.
- MB BCh is used by the Welsh universities, Cardiff University and Swansea University.
- MB, BCh, BAO is used at the Queen's University, Belfast
- MB BS is used at all medical schools currently or previously part of the University of London (aka The United Hospitals) (Imperial College School of Medicine, UCL Medical School, King's College London School of Medicine, Barts and The London School of Medicine and St George's, University of London). Other medical schools that also award an "MB BS" are Norwich Medical School, Hull York Medical School, Newcastle University, University of Central Lancashire and Ulster University (which is currently partnered with St George's)
- BM BCh is awarded by the University of Oxford.
- BM BS is used at the University of Nottingham, University of Exeter, University of Plymouth, University of Southampton, University of Surrey, Kent and Medway Medical School and Brighton and Sussex Medical School (formerly at Peninsula College of Medicine and Dentistry)
- BM was previously awarded at the University of Southampton. However, beginning in 2013 students have been awarded BMBS. Although no degree in surgery was formally awarded by Southampton, this degree was equivalent to the MB ChB; students may go on to a career in surgery the same as any other graduates in medicine and surgery.
- MB BChir is awarded by the University of Cambridge.

At the universities of Oxford and Cambridge, the preclinical course leads to an additional Bachelor of Arts (BA), degree (upgradable after three or four years to Master of Arts), after which most students used to go elsewhere (but usually to one of the London teaching hospitals) to complete clinical training. They were then awarded degrees by their new university: They used to have the options of returning to their old university to take the clinical examinations or taking one of the old non-university qualifying examinations. All students at Oxford and Cambridge now remain in place for their clinical training.

==== Scotland ====
All medical schools in Scotland (Aberdeen, Dundee, Edinburgh and Glasgow) award MB ChB.

The University of St Andrews School of Medicine awarded MB ChB until the early 1970s, but since the incorporation of its clinical medical school into the University of Dundee, St Andrews only awarded a pre-clinical BSc or BSc (Hons), and students go to a Partner Medical School (Aberdeen, Dundee, Edinburgh, Glasgow, or Manchester), where they were awarded an MB ChB after a further three years' study. However, from March 2024 St Andrews regained the right to award the MBChB degree from the general Medical Council in partnership with NHS Fife. There is also a programme for Canadian Citizens and residents whereby they complete 3 years at St. Andrews, then 3 years at Edinburgh and are assisted with applying for residency back in Canada.

Since 2018, a joint initiative coordinated by both the Universities of St Andrews and Dundee, the Scottish Graduate Entry Medicine (ScotGEM) programme, has based its first and second year students at St Andrews, and its third and fourth year students at Dundee. This is Scotland's first graduate entry medical degree programme. The intention is that the students of the inaugural cohort, due to graduate in July 2022, will be conferred a joint MB ChB by both universities – the first to graduate with this professional degree directly from St Andrews in over fifty years.

The Scottish Triple Qualification of LRCPE, LRCSE, LRCPSG (earlier LRCPE, LRCSE, LRFPSG) is an old non-university qualifying examination in medicine and surgery awarded jointly by the Royal College of Physicians of Edinburgh, Royal College of Surgeons of Edinburgh and Royal College of Physicians and Surgeons of Glasgow, previously through a Conjoint Board and from 1994 through the United Examining Board. The UEB was dissolved in 2007. These qualifications are still registrable with the GMC, but permission to award them was withdrawn by the Privy Council of the UK in 1999.

==== Historical Primary Medical Qualifications ====
The Conjoint diplomas LRCP MRCS LMSSA were non-university qualifying examinations in medicine and surgery awarded jointly by the Royal College of Physicians of London, Royal College of Surgeons of England and Society of Apothecaries through the United Examining Board from 1994 until 1999, when the General Medical Council withdrew permission. Before 1994, the English Conjoint diploma of LRCP, MRCS was awarded for 110 years, and the LMSSA was a distinct and sometimes less-esteemed qualification. These diplomas slowly became less popular among British medical students, but as recently as 1938 only a half of them qualified with university degrees. The diplomas are now mostly awarded to those who have already qualified in medicine overseas or who failed their medical school finals.

=== United States ===
International medical graduates who hold an MBBS degree from a foreign country usually do not need to attend medical school again in the United States. However, they must complete a U.S. residency program and pass all three parts of the United States Medical Licensing Examination (USMLE). The MBBS degree is not offered by medical schools in the United States, as most U.S. medical programs are graduate-entry and traditionally award the MD degree as the primary medical qualification.

There are a number of institutions in the United States that offer a combined 6-year BS-MD joint degree, notably Northeast Ohio Medical University whereby graduating high school seniors complete an accelerated bachelor's degree in two years followed by an MD at the traditional four-year pace. Although the BS-MD pathway is a hybrid undergraduate/graduate program, the result is a primary medical qualification equivalent to an MBBS degree and graduates of these schools go on to enter their intern year at roughly the same age as their UK counterparts. Most American schools offering a BS-MD program do so in 7 years, such as the Indiana University School of Medicine, or in 8 years, such as the Baylor College of Medicine. The Association of American Medical Colleges maintains a list of such schools.

Primarily US-educated MDs and Doctors of Osteopathic Medicine (DOs) go through four years of undergraduate education and apply to professional medical graduate schools with a competitive Medical College Admission Test score and GPA. They then go through two more years of didactic medical science study, and take the pass-fail USMLE Step 1 exam. DO students take a similar exam known as COMLEX Level 1. Following a pass, they then undergo experiential learning of medicine by taking part in patient care in clinics and hospitals under the close supervision of board-certified physicians. After this year, they take the Step 2 Clinical Knowledge exam and formerly took the Step 2 Clinical Skills exam as well. DO students take the COMLEX Level 2-Cognitive Evaluation exam and previously took the COMLEX Level 2-Performance Evaluation exam. COMLEX 2-PE and Step 2 CS were discontinued in 2021 during the COVID-19 pandemic. They then go through one more year of experiential learning, often with elective rotations tailored to particular interests of study or future specialization. They also apply for the National Resident Matching Program in this year. Following their fourth and final year, they graduate from medical school and are awarded their MD or DO degree. If selected for a residency, they continue for a minimum of three to eight years in their specialty where they are officially licensed to practise after completion. New resident physicians, or interns, in the first year of residency, known as intern year or internship, often take the USMLE Step 3 exam or COMLEX Level 3 exam during that year.

Undergraduate students applying to medical school also have the option to apply to an MD/PhD Medical Scientist Training Program at various academic institutions, which entails 7–8 years of primary medical education that is combined with a doctoral thesis. MD/PhD students are required to take all USMLE exams and postgraduate residency training if they wish to practise medicine. A few schools, such as Ohio University's Heritage College of Osteopathic Medicine or the Michigan State University College of Osteopathic Medicine, offer DO/PhD programs.

Most MBBS physicians visiting or practising in the United States use the designation of MD for various personal and professional reasons, but laws may change to require full disclosure when presenting as a clinical practitioner for litigious reasons. The MD title is distinctly used in the US for physicians who earned their medical degree in the US who practise evidence-based medicine. They separate themselves from DOs who go through a different type of education and training that focuses on the patient as a whole and an array of treatments inclusive of medicine and surgery as well.

=== West Indies ===
All constituent countries of the University of the West Indies (UWI) confer MB BS, due to the historical affiliation of UWI to the University of London. The degree is a 5-year programme. The three physical campuses are Mona in Jamaica, Saint Augustine in Trinidad and Tobago, and Cave Hill in Barbados, with each campus having a Medical Faculty. The University of Guyana (UG) also confers "MB BS" to their medical school graduates. There are other medical schools in the West Indies, but these follow the North-American system leading to MD.

=== Zambia ===
All schools in Zambia award the MBChB degree.. Texila American University Zambia also offers the MBChB degree.

=== Zimbabwe ===
The University of Zimbabwe College of Health Sciences (UZ-CHS) awards the MBChB degree. Midlands State University (MSU) also offers the MBChB degree. The National University of Science and Technology (NUST) awards the MBBS.

== Classification ==
Medical degrees differ from other undergraduate degrees in that they are professional qualifications that lead holders to enter a particular career upon receipt. This is not the case with most other undergraduate degrees, so whilst the Bachelor of Medicine and Bachelor of Surgery are undergraduate or graduate degrees (depending on the institution), they are perhaps more accurately conceptualised as a so-called first professional degree. Other professions whose qualifications follow a similar pattern include:

- Dentistry
- Education
- Engineering
- Environmental Health
- Medical Laboratory Science
- Occupational Therapy
- Optometry
- Pharmacy
- Physical Therapy
- Clinical Psychology
- Law
- Veterinary Medicine
- Osteopathy
- Physician Assistant
- Nursing
- OT Technician

Bachelor of Medicine, Bachelor of Surgery are usually awarded as professional degrees, not as honours degrees, and as such the graduate is not classified as for honours degrees in other subjects. However, at many institutions (for example the Lancaster University, University of Aberdeen, University of Birmingham, University of Sheffield, University of Liverpool, University of Leicester, Hull York Medical School, and University of Manchester in England, Queen's University Belfast in Northern Ireland, Cardiff University in Wales and the University of Dundee in Scotland), it is possible for the degrees to be awarded with Honours (i.e. MB ChB (Hons.)) or with Commendation, if the board of examiners recognises exceptional performance throughout the degree course. Very few of these are awarded.

More often, it is possible to study one subject for an extra year for an intercalated honours degree. This is usually a Bachelor of Science (BSc), Bachelor of Medical Science (BMedSci), Bachelor of Medical Biology (BMedBiol) or similar: at Oxford and Cambridge in England and Dublin in Ireland Bachelor of Arts degrees are awarded. At a few universities most medical students obtain an ordinary degree in science as well: when the University of Edinburgh had a six-year course, the third year was followed by the award of an ordinary BSc(MedSci). In Australia, The University of Melbourne in Australia offers an Arts Degree (BA) to a medical student on the completion of two extra years of undergraduate study, and Monash University offers a law degree (LLB); if the optional law degree is undertaken, on completion of their degree the student may choose to do a one-year internship at a hospital and become a doctor, or spend one year doing articles to practise thereafter as a lawyer. At the University of Nottingham and the University of Southampton, both in England, all medical students on the five-year course obtain a Bachelor of Medical Sciences (BMedSci) degree without an extra intercalated year. At the University of Cambridge, Imperial College London and University College London, certain medical students are able to extend their intercalated year to an extra three years, thus temporarily exiting the MBBS course to complete a PhD. Upon completion of the PhD, the student is required to sit the remaining 2 years of the medicine course to receive his/her MBBS degree. The University of the West Indies, Mona in Kingston, Jamaica automatically awards a Bachelor of Medical Sciences (BMedSci) degree to all students who have successfully completed three years of their MBBS programme.

== Progression ==
Medical graduates are eligible to sit postgraduate examinations, including examinations for membership and fellowship of professional institutions. Among the latter are the Membership of the Royal College of Surgeons, postgraduate master's degrees (such as a Master of Surgery or Master of Medicine), and a postgraduate doctorate in medicine (such as Doctor of Medicine or Doctor of Science, if earned in Ireland, the UK or Commonwealth nations, and board certification examinations).

== See also ==
- Bachelor of Ayurveda, Medicine and Surgery
- Bachelor of Unani Medicine and Surgery
- Bachelor's degree
- Doctor of Medicine
- Doctor of Osteopathic Medicine
- Homologation
- List of medical schools
- Master of Medicine
- Master of Surgery
- Medical education
- Medical school
- Pre-medical
