= Blackfriars, London =

Area of central London, England

Coordinates: 51.512°N 0.104°W

Blackfriars
- Location within Greater London
- Sui generis: City of London
- Administrative area: Greater London
- Region: London
- Country: England
- Sovereign state: United Kingdom
- Post town: LONDON
- Postcode district: EC4
- Dialling code: 020
- Police: City of London
- Fire: London
- Ambulance: London
- UK Parliament: Cities of London and Westminster
- London Assembly: City and East

Blackfriars is in central London, specifically the south-west corner of the City of London.

== Blackfriars Priory ==
The City of London, which has extended very little, in the late Middle Ages. The once wholly walled square mile is nationally referred to as "The City". Locally is one of the notable extensions, meaning Blackfriars forms the south-west corner of the city, save for Temple which is technically a special category in local government.

The name first occurs in records of 1317 in many orthographies. Friar evolved from Latin: frater as French: frère has, meaning 'brother'. Black refers to the black outer garment, also known as a cappa, worn by Dominican Friars. They moved their 1220s-founded priory from just west of Holborn bridge at the top of Shoe Lane (modern Holborn Circus) a few hundred metres south to be between the tidal Thames and the west of Ludgate Hill, a modest rise, but the highest in the city proper, in about 1276. Edward I gave permission to rebuild London's city wall, against the Fleet brook and Ludgate Hill, north and west of their precinct. The site hosted great occasions of state, including meetings of Parliament and the Privy Council, state visits, such as of Emperor Charles V in 1522, then, seven years later, a divorce hearing of Catherine of Aragon and Henry VIII. The priory was by legal process dissolved in 1538 under Henry's dissolution of the monasteries. Catherine Parr, Henry's sixth and final wife, was born in an associated parish.

== Local wharves of Puddle Dock ==
Until the early 20th century the local wharves were linked to the main street by the formerly narrow street Puddle Dock. These stood by an often dredged up to, pier- and mooring post-lined, substantial mudbank of the City – in the south-east of modern Blackfriars. Among these were Wheatsheaf Wharf. Paul's Stairs is east of the modern floating pier, leading to the much narrowed, wholly tidal foreshore (meaning immersed for much of the tidal phases).

== Amenities ==
Some of the buildings were later leased to a group of entrepreneurs who created the Blackfriars Theatre on the site, near Shakespeare's Globe Theatre which stood almost directly across the river. In 1632, the Society of Apothecaries (a livery company), acquired the late medieval guesthouse which they converted as their base. This was destroyed in the Great Fire of London of 1666 but the Society rebuilt it, becoming today's Apothecaries' Hall due north of the station.

At the very centre of the zone, in typical London equidistance from stations post-pariochial terms, is Blackfriars station on a large wholly built-up roundabout. Southwest of this is Blackfriars Bridge and south, the railway bridge. A notably long road, Blackfriars Road, in Bankside, Southwark – a main approach to the road bridge – hosts near its northern extreme skyscraper One Blackfriars. For a short arc north-west of the small gyratory around the large station complex (with Bridge House, office and retail buildings) stretches back the Crowne Plaza London – The City hotel, a conversion from Spicers Brothers papermakers headquarters, of 1916 facing a few mature trees on a hardscaped small "square" or piazza. Southeast of this circle is Blackfriars Millennium Pier, a stop for river-bus services on London River Services.

The Victoria Embankment stretches along the north bank of the river west from Blackfriars to Westminster Bridge. Notable buildings include the large Art Deco Unilever House, and also facing the station's gyratory, the Art Nouveau Black Friar pub. Further clockwise, facing, are the Bank of New York/Mellon building and the Mermaid Theatre, now a conference centre.

The forerunner station stood south of the river, Blackfriars Bridge railway station, no major trace of which remains. It was closed to passengers in 1885 when the current station opened, as "St Pauls" for some decades.

== Listed buildings ==
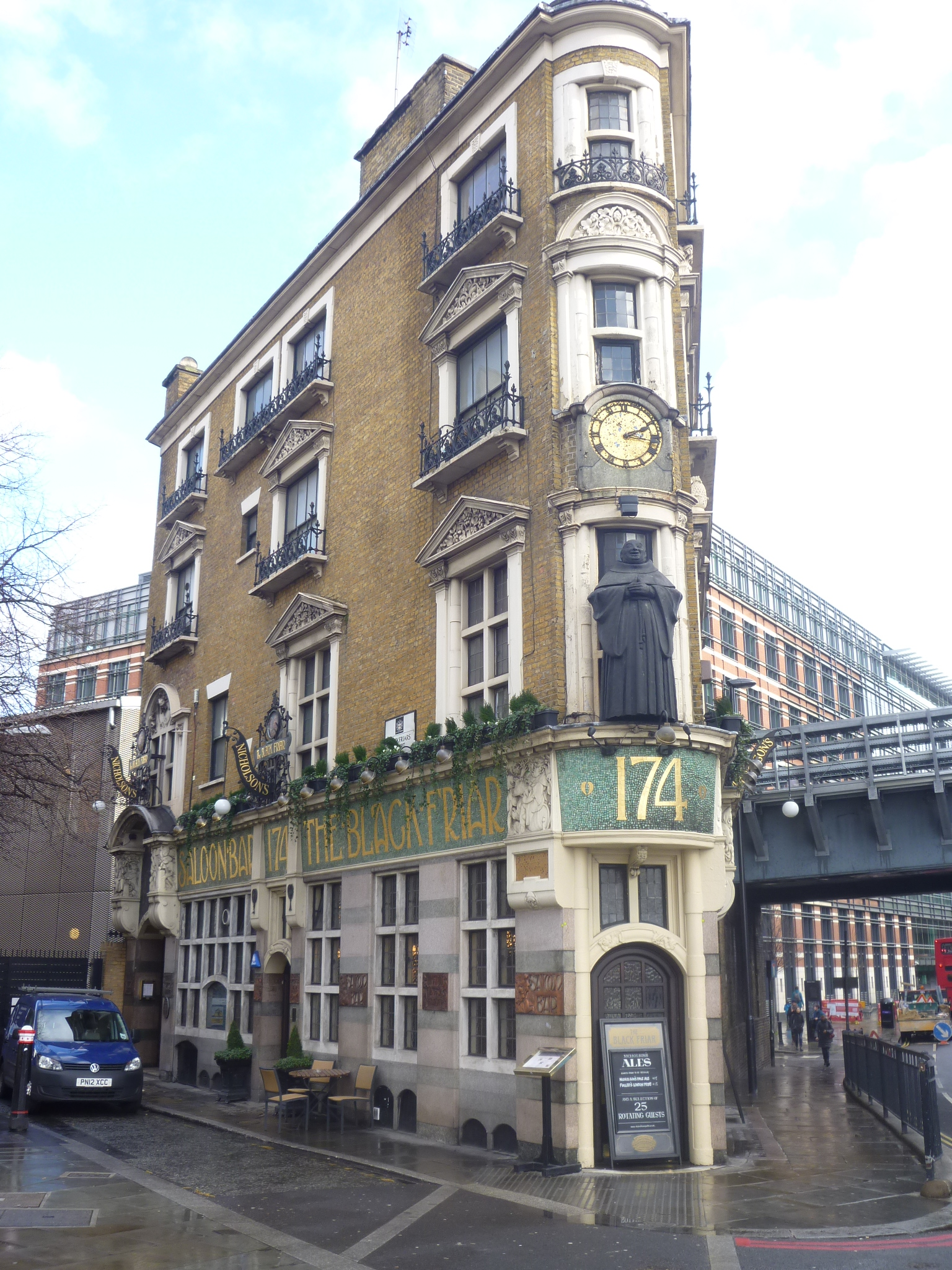
The Black Friar, a public house with a few apartments above has a rare, Flatiron Building shape and is Grade II* listed. It is the narrowest building facing the station's riverside gyratory which is the heart of the modern informal definition.

One or two elaborate streets of Blackfriars were well repaired after the city was heavily bombed in the Blitz (1940 to 1945). These, of genuine Victorian or city Georgian architecture, are frequently sets for film and television series. These include Sherlock Holmes and David Copperfield.

== Burials at Blackfriars, London ==
- Elizabeth de Badlesmere, Countess of Northampton
- Edward Hastings, 2nd Baron Hastings
- Robert St. Lawrence 3rd Baron Howth
- Hubert de Burgh, 1st Earl of Kent
- John Cornwall, 1st Baron Fanhope

== Neighbouring parts of London ==
- North bank, clockwise:
  - Temple
  - Fleet Street
  - Ludgate Hill/City Thameslink
  - St Paul's
    - Mansion House (south-east of above)
- South bank:
  - Bankside

== Gallery ==
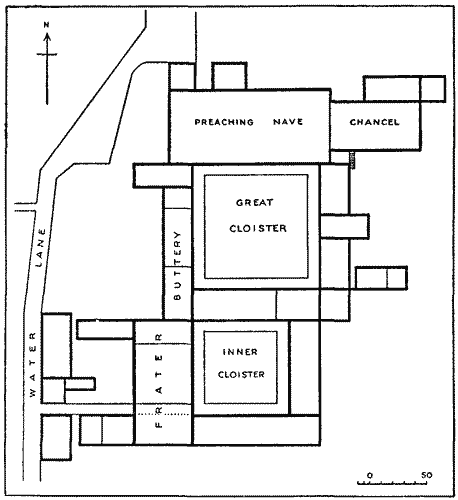
Ground plan of Blackfriars Monastery as it appeared before the dissolution of the monasteries. The Buttery became Farrant's; the Frater, Burbage's playhouse.

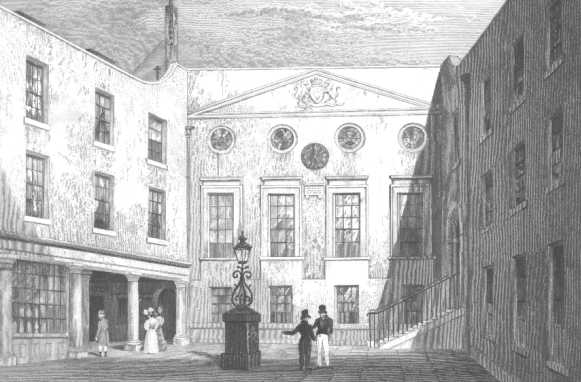
Apothecaries' Hall in Blackfriars, 1831

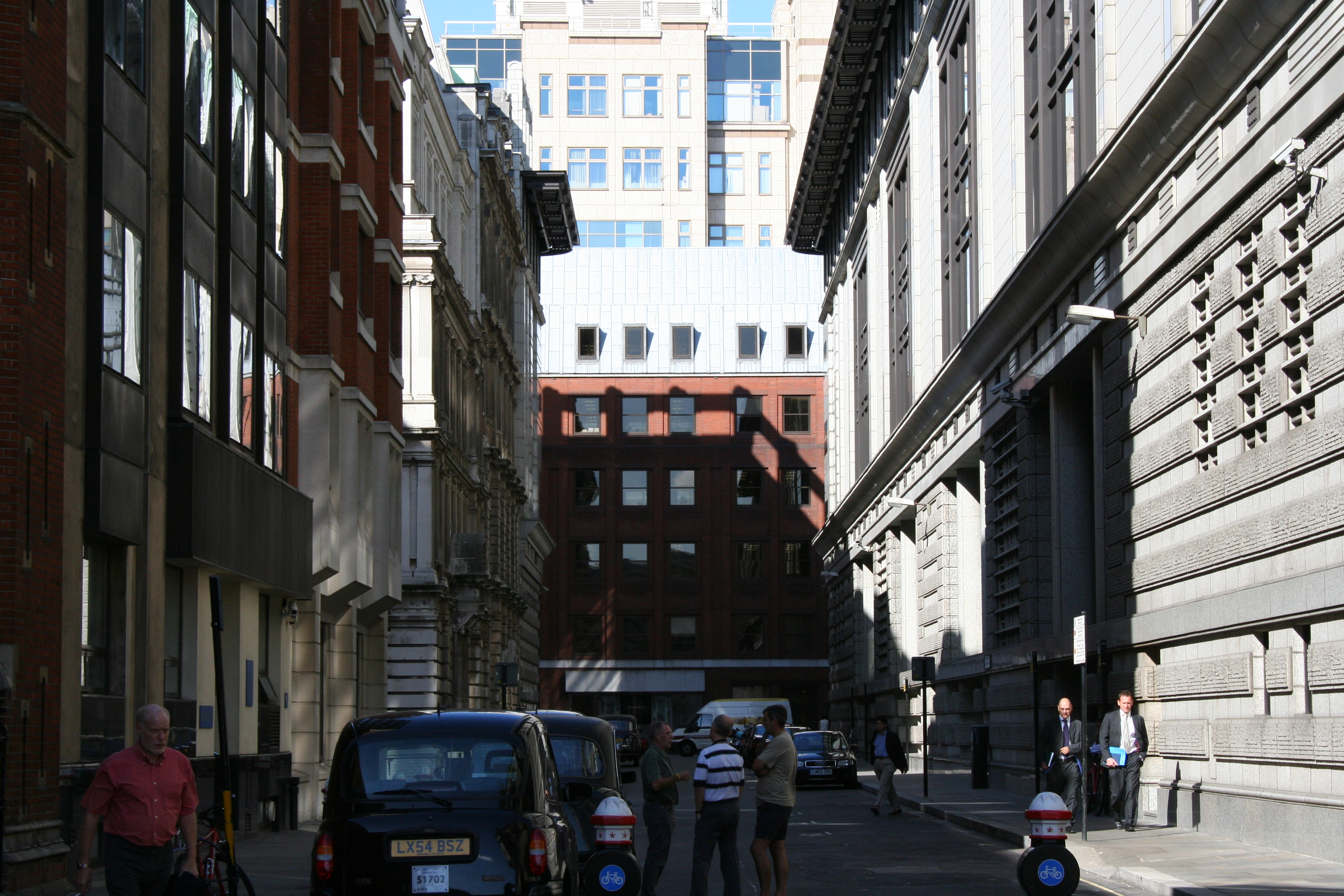
Blackfriars is home to many investment banks and financial services companies

== See also ==
List of monastic houses in London
