= Conflict and Catastrophe Medicine =

Medical specialty

Conflict and Catastrophe Medicine is a small medical specialty that operates within disaster areas whether they are natural or human caused disasters. Currently many healthcare professionals are involved in the Ebola crisis of 2014. Conflict and Catastrophe medicine is a specialized form of humanitarian aid.

== History ==
Conflict and Catastrophe Medicine has for many years operated both informally and as the remit of the military or governmental peacekeeping organisations such as the United Nations. It is a small medical specialty and in civilian terms has been operating informally for many years. In recent years there has been a formalizing of the role of conflict and catastrophe medicine and in 2005 both the Society of Apothecaries and Royal Society of Medicine formed a faculty and a forum respectively.

== Organisations working within education of Conflict and Catastrophe ==
- Faculty of Conflict and Castastrophe medicine
- Royal Society of Medicine

=== Qualifications within Conflict and Catastrophe medicine ===
As it is a small specialty, there are few mainstream qualifications within conflict and catastrophe medicine however there are a number of training opportunities and a Postgraduate qualification offered by the Society of Apothecaries called the Diploma in the Medical Care of Catastrophes.

== Organisations working within Conflict and Catastrophe Environments ==
- RedR
- Medecins sans Frontieres
