= Naypyitaw State Academy =

State university in Naypyidaw, Myanmar

- နေပြည်တော်တက္ကသိုလ်
- Other name: NSA
- Motto: ပညာဧဝ အဓိပတိ
- Type: Faculties complex
- Rector: Dr. Nu Nu Lwin
- Location: Naypyitaw, Naypyitaw Union Territory, Myanmar

Naypyitaw State Academy (NSA) is a state university located in Naypyidaw, the capital city of Myanmar. Situated in Zabuthiri Township, the institution comprises faculties of arts, science, law, economics, medicine, social studies, and sports.

NSA opened on 9 November 2022 to provide higher education opportunities for students in Naypyidaw Union Territory, particularly civil servants' families and local residents, reducing the need to relocate to larger cities such as Yangon and Mandalay.

== Faculties ==
=== Faculty of Medicine ===
Established by the Department of Human Resources under the Ministry of Health, the Faculty of Medicine offers undergraduate medical courses leading to the Bachelor of Medicine, Bachelor of Surgery (M.B., B.S.) degree. The curriculum corresponds with national standards used by other medical universities in Myanmar, admitting eligible students residing in Naypyidaw.

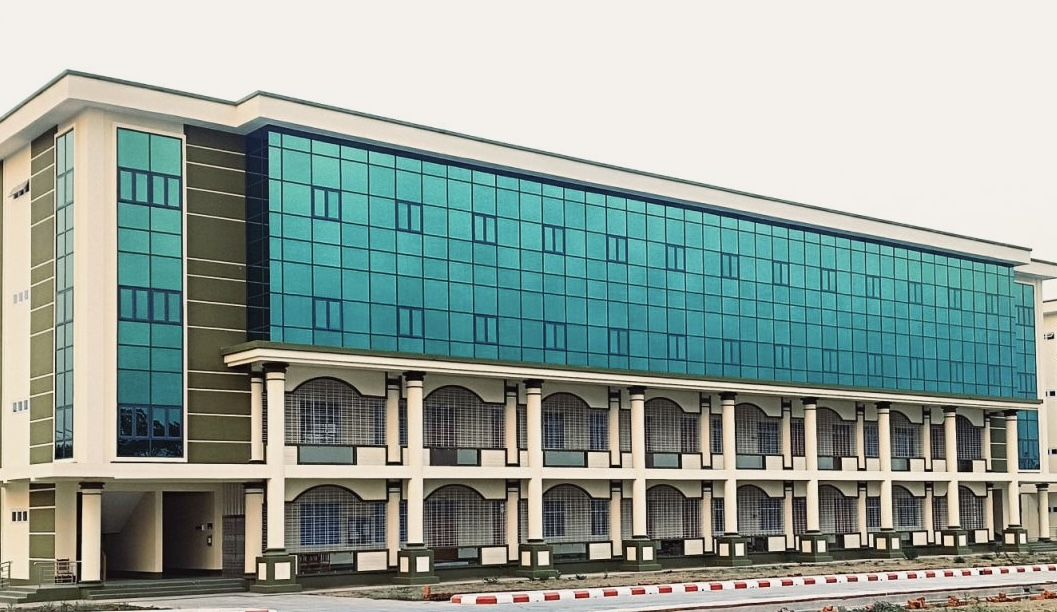
Faculty of Medicine, NSA

=== Faculty of Sports ===
The Faculty of Sports utilizes the facilities at the adjacent Wunna Theikdi Stadium for practical coursework. The program offers training in sports science, coaching, sports management, and athletic event administration.

=== Faculty of Law ===
The Faculty of Law offers courses leading to the Bachelor of Laws (LL.B.) and Bachelor of Arts in Law (BA Law) degrees, covering legal theory, ethics, and community legal aid services.
