= Faculty of Conflict and Catastrophe Medicine =

The Faculty of Conflict and Catastrophe Medicine
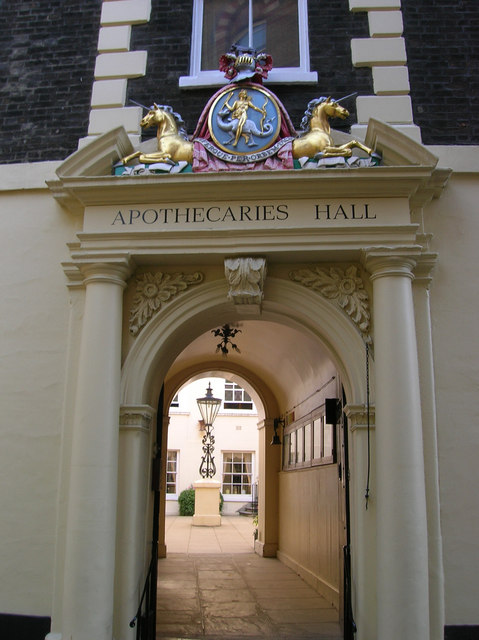
- Location: Apothecaries' Hall; Black Friars Lane, London
- Date of formation: 2005
- Company association: Medicine
- Website: Faculty of Conflict and Catastrophe Medicine

The Faculty of Conflict and Catastrophe Medicine operates under the Society of Apothecaries though it is considered a separate organisation with its own registered charity status. It was established in 2005, shortly after the London bombings where on review it was felt that medical organisations would benefit from training in dealing with extreme situations i.e. Conflict and Catastrophe Medicine.

== Education ==
The main focus of the Faculty is the provision of education through its year-long postgraduate diploma Conflict and Catastrophe course.

=== Student Elective ===
The faculty awards a student elective prize every year.

== Events and Lectures ==
The Faculty of Conflict and Catastrophe hold two lectures each year which are open to the public; the Audrey Few Lecture and their Spring Lecture.

=== Previous Speakers at Lectures ===
The Faculty has previously hosted

- Ari Leppaniemi on the topic of advancements in surgery
- Kate Adie
- Stephanie Simmonds – on the topic of humanitarian Aid as a donor, UN and NGO stakeholder'
- Dr Roel Coutinho on the topic of Infectious Diseases in a Global Setting
- Dr Emer McGilloway on the topic of History and Recent Advances in the Rehabilitation of Brain Injured Personnel
