= Conjoint =

Defunct medical degree in England

The conjoint was a basic medical qualification in the United Kingdom administered by the United Examining Board. It is now no longer awarded. The Conjoint Board was superseded in 1994 by the United Examining Board, which lost its permission to hold qualifying medical examinations after 1999.

Medical education at the London Teaching Hospitals began centuries before there was a university in London to award medical degrees. Those who had taken BAs at Oxford or Cambridge, or occasionally started their pre-clinical education at universities further afield, could return there to take medical examinations, but it was open to most to take the examinations of the London medical corporations.

As the early 19th century law restricting medical employment in the British military to those who had qualifications in both medicine and surgery was taken to require diplomas from different organisations, it became customary to take both the Licence of the Society of Apothecaries (LSA) and the Membership of the Royal College of Surgeons of England (MRCS).

These corporations diverged: the Society of Apothecaries added surgery to their examination, to grant a Licence in Medicine and Surgery (LMSSA) as a complete qualification. The surgeons then teamed up with the Royal College of Physicians of London who paired their Licentiate diploma (LRCP) with the MRCS to create the English Conjoint Diploma in 1884.

The London LRCP had previously been a means for Bachelors or licentiates in medicine from Oxford and Cambridge (and a few MDs from elsewhere) to qualify to practise in London as physicians (i.e. internal medicine specialists, as distinct from surgeons or apothecaries). The old LRCP also allowed the holder by custom to be addressed as "doctor" without holding a university doctorate: this privilege became generalised in the 19th century to all licentiates and Bachelors of Medicine.

The nomenclature of the diplomas may have contributed to the nearly-obsolete practice of general practitioners styling themselves as "Physician and Surgeon": previously they were mostly regarded as Apothecaries.

There were also Scottish and Irish conjoint qualifications: the former became known as the Triple Qualification.

In the 19th century, the new University of London Bachelor of Medicine and Bachelor of Surgery degrees were regarded as more academic than the Royal Colleges' diplomas, so many people qualified and started practice with the Conjoint before taking the M.B. and B.S. a year or two later. This paralleled the practice in some European countries of taking a state medical examination separately from or instead of a university degree. In the English provincial cities, some medical schools developed separately from the new Redbrick universities, so the Conjoint diplomas were at first usually taken.

Armed forces officer cadets would be promoted from second lieutenant to lieutenant on qualifying, which included the conjoint qualification. The difference in pay between the times of the two exams would more than pay for the entry fee, and seniority in the officer corps was enhanced by those few months.

The conjoint diploma of the London Royal Colleges (Royal College of Surgeons of England and Royal College of Physicians of London) was more reputable in its day, but after World War II, it was regarded as a practice exam before university finals. It provided a safety net in that medical students unsure whether they would pass or fail would have two chances if they took both.

By far the greatest use of the Conjoint and similar qualifications in recent years was as a means for foreign medical graduates to obtain British qualifications, which eased their problems of obtaining registration and employment in the U.K., and also made it easier to go on to work in third countries.

The scheme of examinations included a notional full set of pre-clinical subjects (anatomy, physiology, pharmacology, pathology, etc.) from which those who had university passes or another final medical qualification would be exempted: but fees might still have to be paid.

The closure of this portal, along with the recent recategorisation of junior doctors from student to worker status for immigration purposes, may hasten the changeover of the National Health Service's dependence from Third World medical graduates to European Union doctors, who may not be asked to submit to further examination.

These subtleties of the British system of medical qualifications were rarely known to patients, who may have been more impressed to see "MB BS MRCS LRCP" on a brass plate than "MD FRCP".
