= United Examining Board =

The United Examining Board was formed in 1993 to administer non-university qualifying examinations in medicine and surgery. The diplomas offered by the United Examining Board were registerable with the General Medical Council in order to register as a medical practitioner in the United Kingdom, and an individual who had passed the examination could become a Pre-registration house officer.

The qualifications offered by the United Examining Board were either the

- English Triple Conjoint (Licence of the Royal College of Physicians of London, Licence of the Royal College of Surgeons of England, Licence in Medicine and Surgery of the Society of Apothecaries)

abbreviated as LRCP, LRCS, LMSSA

or the

- Scottish Triple Qualification, awarded since 1886, (Licence of the Royal College of Physicians of Edinburgh, Licence of the Royal College of Surgeons of Edinburgh, Licence of the Royal College of Physicians and Surgeons of Glasgow).

abbreviated as LRCP, LRCS, LRCPS or LRCPE, LRCSE, LRCPSG

These examinations were usually taken either by partly trained refugee doctors, or by doctors who had been trained at an overseas medical school not recognised by the World Health Organization, or by other overseas graduates who wished to transfer more easily from limited to full registration with the General Medical Council. They were also taken by students who had attended a UK medical school for one of two reasons; the first being those who had failed to obtain their primary medical qualification equivalent to a Bachelor of Medicine and Surgery; and the second being that students were allowed to sit these exams, or their precursors, before they were able to take the degrees from their own universities and so sitting this exam could mean earlier GMC registration and therefore enabled them to earn money sooner.

They were criticized as being a "backdoor into medicine".

The United Examining Board was dissolved in 2007.
