= Apothecaries Act 1815 =

Act of the Parliament of the United Kingdom

Apothecaries Act 1815 (Note: The citation of this act by this short title was authorised by section 1 of, and the first schedule to, the Short Titles Act 1896. Due to the repeal of those provisions it is now authorised by section 19(2) of the Interpretation Act 1978.)
- Act of Parliament
- Parliament of the United Kingdom
- Long title: An Act for better regulating the Practice of Apothecaries throughout England and Wales.
- Citation: 55 Geo. 3. c. 194
- Territorial extent: United Kingdom

Dates
- Royal assent: 12 July 1815
- Commencement: 12 July 1815 (Note: The Acts of Parliament (Commencement) Act 1793.)
- Repealed: 16 November 1989
Other legislation
Amended by	Apothecaries Amendment Act 1825; Apothecaries Act Amendment Act 1874; Statute Law Revision Act 1887; Statute Law Revision Act 1888; Statute Law Revision Act 1890; Public Authorities Protection Act 1893; Food and Drugs Act 1938; Statute Law (Repeals) Act 1976; Statute Law (Repeals) Act 1981
Repealed by	Statute Law (Repeals) Act 1989

Status: Repealed

Text of statute as originally enacted

Apothecaries Amendment Act 1825
- Act of Parliament
- Parliament of the United Kingdom
- Long title: An act to amend and explain an Act of the Fifty fifth Year of His late Majesty, for better regulating the Practice of Apothecaries throughout England and Wales.
- Citation: 6 Geo. 4. c. 133
- Territorial extent: United Kingdom

Dates
- Royal assent: 6 July 1825
- Commencement: 6 July 1825 (Note: Section 1.)
- Repealed: 5 August 1873
Other legislation
Amends	Apothecaries Act 1815
Repealed by	Statute Law Revision Act 1873

Status: Repealed

Text of statute as originally enacted

The Apothecaries Act 1815 (55 Geo. 3. c. 194) or the Medical Act 1815 was an act of the Parliament of the United Kingdom with the long title "An Act for better regulating the Practice of Apothecaries throughout England and Wales". The Act introduced compulsory apprenticeship and formal qualifications for apothecaries, in modern terms general practitioners, under the license of the Society of Apothecaries. It was the beginning of regulation of the medical profession in the United Kingdom. The Act required instruction in anatomy, botany, chemistry, materia medica and "physic", in addition to six months' practical hospital experience.

Despite the act, training of medical people in Britain remained disparate. Thomas Bonner, in part quoting M. Jeanne Peterson, notes that "The training of a practitioner in Britain in 1830 could vary all the way from classical university study at Oxford and Cambridge to a series of courses in a provincial hospital to 'broom-and-apron apprenticeship in an apothecary's shop'".

== In popular culture ==
- George Eliot refers to the act and other early 19th century reforms in the 1871–72 social novel Middlemarch, set in 1829, while describing Dr. Lydgate's approach to pathology.

== Subsequent developments ==
Section 30 of the act was repealed by section 2 of, and the schedule to, the Public Authorities Protection Act 1893 (56 & 57 Vict. c. 61), which came into force on 1 January 1894.

Section 5, in section 8, the words "or by the five apothecaries hereinafter mentioned, or the major part of them present", in section 9, the words from "and such court", where secondly occurring, onwards, in section 17, the words "or by five apothecaries so to be appointed as hereinafter is mentioned" and "or from the said five apothecaries", sections 18, 20 and 21, in section 22, the words "or the said five apothecaries so to be appointed for any county or counties as aforesaid" and "or to and for the said five apothecaries in any county or counties as aforesaid", and sections 25, 26 and 27 were repealed by section 1(1) of, and part X of schedule 1 to, the Statute Law (Repeals) Act 1976, which came into force on 27 May 1976.

The whole act was repealed by section 1(1) of, and part V of schedule 1 to, the Statute Law (Repeals) Act 1989, which came into force on 16 November 1989.
