= Apothecaries' Hall, London =

Livery hall in the City of London

Coordinates: 51.512928°N 0.10305497°W

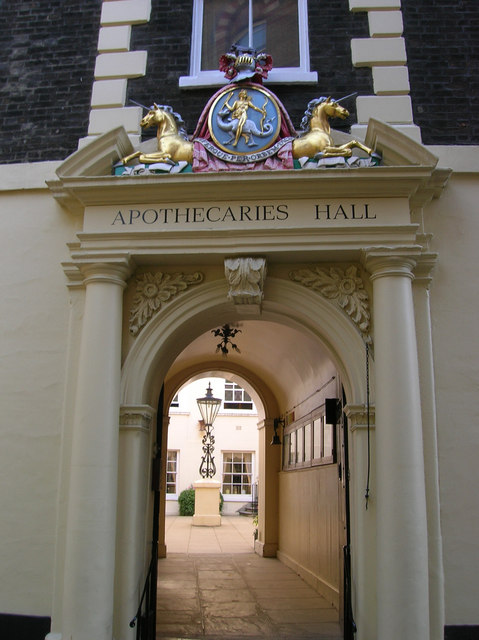
Apothecaries' Hall

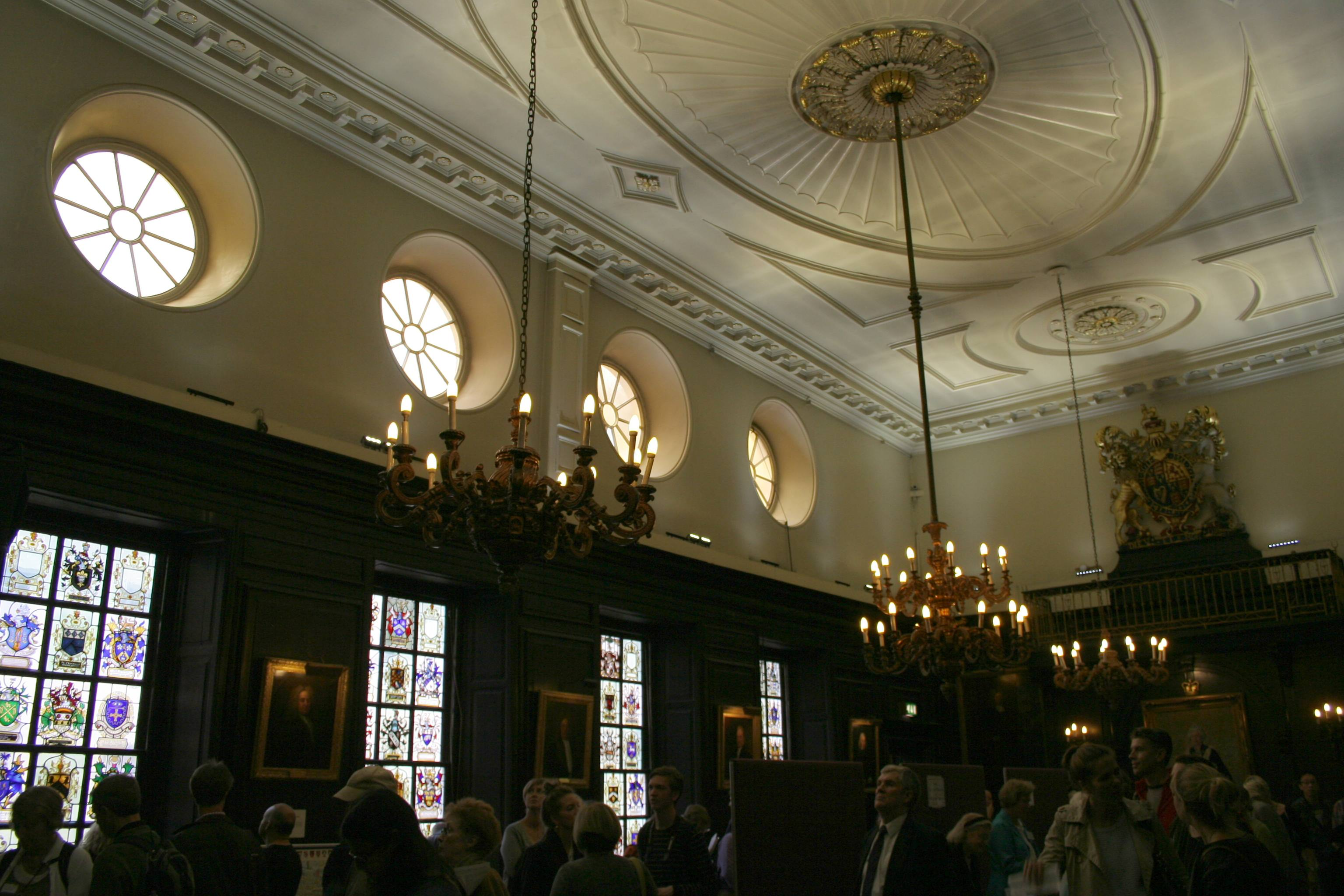
Great Hall interior

Apothecaries Hall is a scheduled monument at Black Friars Lane, London. It is the headquarters of the Worshipful Society of Apothecaries of London, one of the livery companies of the City of London. It is one of the largest livery companies (with over 1,600 members in 2012) and ranks 58th in their order of precedence. The building, originally part of the Dominican priory of Black Friars, was called Cobham House prior to its purchase by the society in 1632.

The original building was destroyed in the Great Fire of London in 1666, although a significant extent of the 13th-century buildings remain, including a 9-metre-high (30 ft) portion of the walls, now incorporated into the north range of the hall courtyard. A new hall was built on the same site and footprint of rooms, and completed in 1672 to the design of Edward Jerman; an "Elaboratory" was included at this time for the first-ever large-scale manufacture of drugs. From then until 1922, the society manufactured medicinal and pharmaceutical products at their hall, and sold some of their products from a retail outlet opening onto Water Lane (now Blackfriars Lane). Much of the manufactured drugs were to supply clients of the society which included the navy, the army, the East India Company and the Crown Colonies. A major restoration and (external) building programme was carried out in the 1780s. Although the hall underwent further redevelopment in the 1980s, its appearance has altered little since the late-eighteenth century externally and late-seventeenth century internally.

Apothecaries' Hall is the oldest extant livery hall in the City of London, with significant 13th-century elements, and the first-floor structure and arrangement of the Great Hall, Court Room and Parlour remaining as rebuilt between 1668 and 1670.
