= Apothecaries' Hall of Ireland =

Guild for Apothecaries (practitioners of medicine) in Dublin; from 1791, for all Ireland

The Governor and Company of The Apothecaries' Hall of the City of Dublin
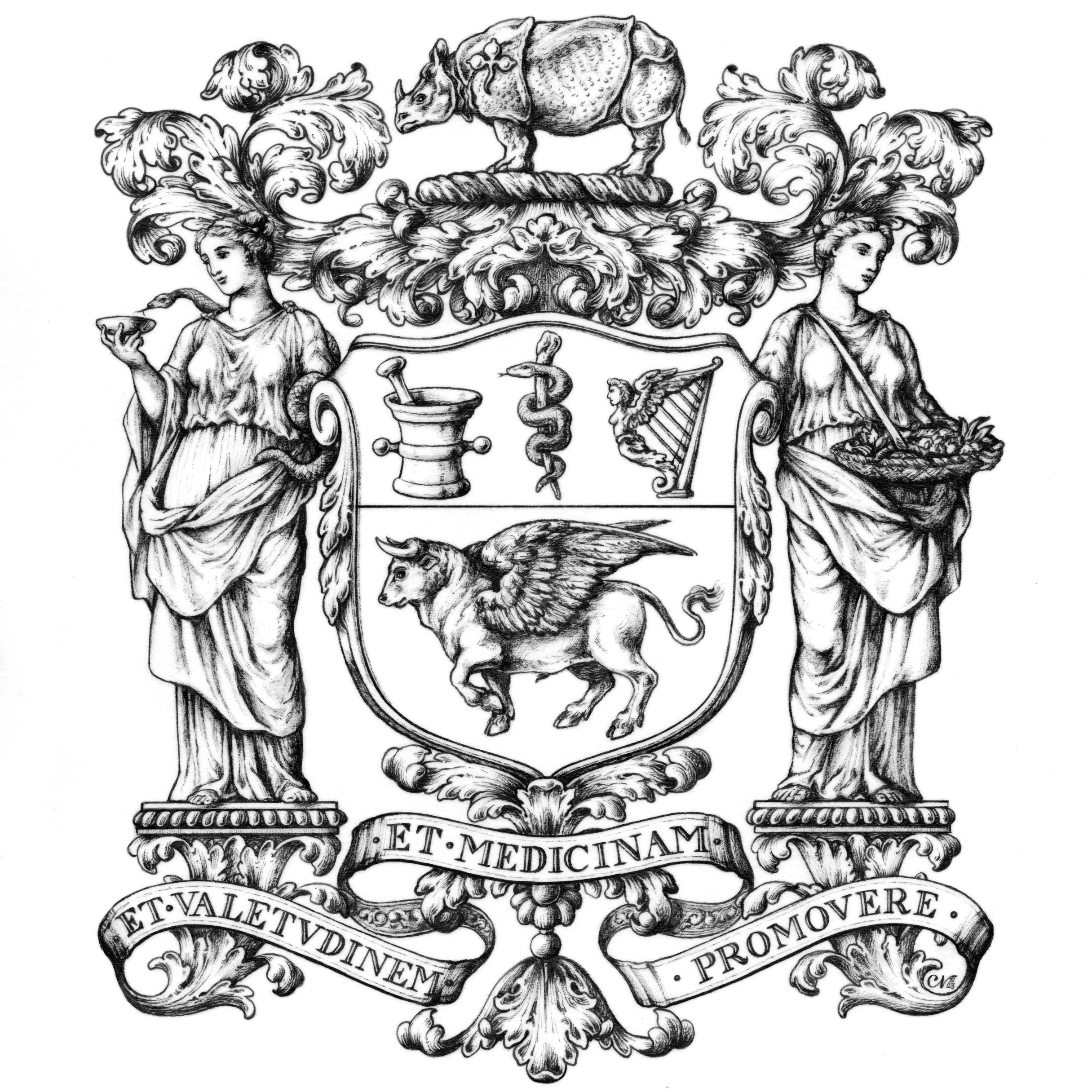
- Coat of Arms
- Location: Royal College of Physicians of Ireland; Kildare Street, Dublin 2 (since 2011)
- Date of formation: Charters: 1446, 1576, 1687 (Guild of St Mary Magdalene), 1747 (Guild of St Luke), Statute: 1791 (Company of Apothecaries' Hall)
- Company association: Medicine and pharmacy
- Master of company: (Governor) Dr Peadar O'Mórdha LAH (2024-27) (also Master 2026-27, Worshipful Society of Apothecaries)
- Website: Apothecaries' Hall, Dublin

The Apothecaries' Hall of Ireland is one of only two extant successors of a medieval Dublin guild. Apothecaries in Dublin were first organized as members of the 1446 Guild of Barbers, with St Mary Magdelene as the patron saint. In 1747, Apothecaries formed their own guild, with St Luke as the patron. In 1791, the Company of Apothecaries’ Hall was formed for the purposes of building their own Hall and regulating practitioners throughout Ireland. Although the Company ceased licensing doctors as a primary qualification in the 1970s, it continues to exist as a statutory corporation. The Company of Apothecaries’ Hall is now housed within the Royal College of Physicians of Ireland on Kildare Street, Dublin.

== History ==
=== Guild of St Mary Magdelene ===
Early apothecaries in Dublin were members of the Guild of Barbers. The patron of the guild was St Mary Magdelene. The Barbers’ Guild was founded in 1446 by a charter of Henry VI (25 Henry VI) (the earliest medical incorporation in Britain or Ireland, before equivalent civic establishments by the City of London in 1462 and by the City of Edinburgh in 1505). Its jurisdiction explicitly included the practice of surgery from 1576 by a charter of Elizabeth I (19 Eliz. I), which also confirmed the membership of both men and women in the guild since the first charter. Barbers and Surgeons had been united in London in 1540, by an act of Parliament.

A third charter, of James II (1687), explicitly a renewal, encompasses the apothecary trade acknowledging that apothecaries had already been members of the Guild.

The Guild of St Mary Magdelene of Barbers, Surgeons, Apothecaries and Periwig-makers was 4th in the guilds' order of precedence and had four members on Common Council of the City of Dublin.

=== Guild of St Luke ===
The Apothecaries separated from the Barber-Surgeons in 1747, by a royal charter of George II (10 February, 20 Geo. II). The patron of the new Apothecaries’ Guild was St Luke the Evangelist, and the Guild of St Luke was 25th in precedence, with two members on the Common Council of Dublin Corporation. (The Barbers’ representation on the Common Council dropped from four to two members when the Apothecaries seceded).

The guild colours (established by 1767) were purple and orange.

== Company of Apothecaries' Hall ==
Apothecaries' Hall Act 1791
- Act of Parliament
- Parliament of Ireland
- Long title: An Act for the more effectually preserving the Health of His Majesty's Subjects, for erecting an Apothecary's Hall in the City of Dublin, and regulating the Profession of an Apothecary throughout the Kingdom of Ireland.
- Citation: 31 Geo. 3 c.34
- Territorial extent: Ireland

Dates
- Royal assent: 5 May 1791
- Commencement: 20 January 1791 (Note: Start of session.)

Status: Amended

Text of statute as originally enacted

Revised text of statute as amended

In 1791, by an act of Parliament, the Apothecaries' Hall Act 1791 (31 Geo. 3. c. 34 (I)), the Company of Apothecaries' Hall was established following a petition from the Master, Wardens and Commonality of the Corporation of Apothecaries (the Guild of St Luke) and other apothecaries of the City of Dublin (as "The Governor and Company of the Apothecaries' Hall of the City of Dublin"). The purpose of the new company was primarily to raise a fund to erect a Hall, but also to prevent "frauds and abuses" so that from thereon there might be a single "...company or fraternity of judicious apothecaries...". The Company had jurisdiction over the whole Kingdom of Ireland. The company – although the governance, structure and membership would have been practically the same – was an entity independent of the guild.

As noted in the act, the first governor was Henry Hunt (1707-1796), who had previously been appointed the first State Apothecary (1784). He was born at Curragh Chase according to Burke's, the son of John "of Glangoole" Hunt and Margaret Bowles, his second wife.

Amongst the principal duties of the company from its foundation was to examine candidates, qualify them to trade as an apothecary, and regulate their practice thereafter. Licenced apothecaries became medical practitioners following The Rose Case in 1704, when a challenge to the practising of medicine by apothecaries brought by the Royal College of Physicians was defeated in the (English) House of Lords, setting a precedent for Ireland. A licence from Apothecaries' Hall (LAH) became a registrable qualification when the General Medical Council was established as the regulator of medical practitioners in 1858, confirming that holders of the qualification practised medicine. In the 1970s the LAH stopped being recognised as a primary qualification although it continues to be registrable as an additional qualification with both the GMC and the Medical Council of Ireland.

Although it cannot exercise its functions of teaching, qualifying and regulating medical practitioners, The Company of Apothecaries’ Hall continues to the present day as one of only two direct extant successors of a medieval Dublin guild. It operates as a fraternal and charitable organisation, promoting the Medical Humanities, and issuing licenses only to already-qualified practitioners from all fields of medicine. Occasionally, Honorary Licences (HonLAH) are awarded to prominent medical figures. Since an Act of Parliament established the Hall, legislation would also be needed to close it. The other extant successor of a Dublin Guild is the Company of Goldsmiths (similarly a successor to the medieval Guild of All Saints) which still runs the Dublin Assay Office.

== Guildhalls and Premises ==
The Guild of St Luke met at the Three Stags’ Heads Tavern on Eustace Street, Dublin.

In 1791, Apothecaries' Hall was erected at 40 Mary Street, at a cost of £6,000. The hall contained a spacious chemical laboratory where medicines were prepared. Lectures were delivered at the hall, and part of it was also a wholesale warehouse, where the apothecaries could procure their materials.

In 1837, the medical school of the Apothecaries’ Hall was established in Cecilia Street, Dublin, which received the necessary recognition from the Royal College of Surgeons in Ireland. In 1854, the buildings and contents were purchased for £1,500 in the name of Andrew Ellis FRCSI, Professor of Surgery in the School of Apothecaries' Hall at Cecilia Street, and a Catholic, to form the Catholic University Medical School which opened in 1855.

In 1923, Apothecaries’ Hall moved to 95 Merrion Square, which was sold in 2011. The Company of Apothecaries’ Hall is now housed by the Royal College of Physicians of Ireland at its premises on Kildare Street.

== See also ==
- Guilds of the City of Dublin
