= ICD-11 =

Medical classification created by the World Health Organisation (WHO)

International Classification of Diseases, 11th Revision
- Screenshot of the ICD-11 MMS Browser, showing the entry for Pneumonia (CA40)
- Abbreviation: ICD-11
- Status: Active
- Year started: 2007
- First published: 18 June 2018 (stable version; adopted 28 May 2019)
- Latest version: 2026-01; 16 February 2026
- Preview version: May 2011 (alpha version); May 2012 (beta version)
- Organization: World Health Organization
- Series: ICD
- Predecessor: ICD-10
- Domain: Medical classification; Medical statistics
- License: CC BY-ND 3.0 IGO
- Website: icd.who.int/browse/latest-release/mms/en

The ICD-11 is the eleventh revision of the International Classification of Diseases (ICD). It replaces the ICD-10 as the global standard for recording health information and causes of death. The ICD is developed and annually updated by the World Health Organization (WHO). Development of the ICD-11 started in 2007 and spanned over a decade of work, involving over 300 specialists from 55 countries divided into 30 work groups, with an additional 10,000 proposals from people all over the world. Following an alpha version in May 2011 and a beta draft in May 2012, a stable version of the ICD-11 was released on 18 June 2018, and officially endorsed by all WHO members during the 72nd World Health Assembly on 28 May 2019.

The ICD-11 is a large ontology consisting of about 85,000 entities, also called classes or nodes. An entity can be anything that is relevant to health care. It usually represents a disease or a pathogen, but it can also be an isolated symptom or (developmental) anomaly of the body. There are also classes for reasons for contact with health services, social circumstances of the patient, and external causes of injury or death. The ICD-11 is part of the WHO-FIC, a family of medical classifications. The WHO-FIC contains the Foundation Component, which comprises all entities of the classifications endorsed by the WHO. The Foundation is the common core from which all classifications are derived. For example, the ICD-O is a derivative classification optimized for use in oncology. The primary derivative of the Foundation is called the ICD-11 MMS, and it is this system that is commonly referred to as simply "the ICD-11". MMS stands for Mortality and Morbidity Statistics. The ICD-11 is distributed under a Creative Commons BY-ND license.

The ICD-11 officially came into effect on 1 January 2022. On 14 February 2023, the WHO reported that 64 countries were "in different stages of ICD-11 implementation". In May 2024, they stated that 50 countries were either conducting or expanding implementation pilots, and that 14 countries were actively using the ICD-11. According to a JAMA article from July 2023, implementation in the United States would at minimum require 4 to 5 years.

The ICD-11 MMS can be viewed online on the WHO's website. Aside from this, the site offers two maintenance platforms: the ICD-11 Maintenance Platform, and the WHO-FIC Foundation Maintenance Platform. Users can submit evidence-based suggestions for the improvement of the WHO-FIC, i.e., the ICD-11, the ICF, and the ICHI.

Globally, the first general public hospital to implement ICD-11 was Farwaniya Hospital, in Kuwait.

== Structure ==
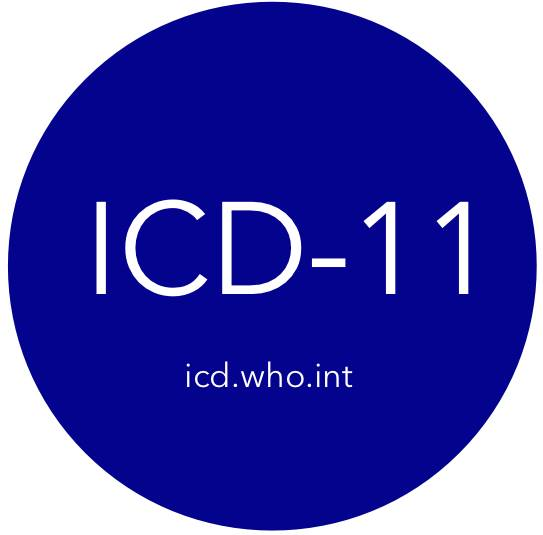
Official ICD-11 logo used by the WHO

=== WHO-FIC ===
The WHO Family of International Classifications (WHO-FIC), also called the WHO Family, is a suite of classifications used to describe various aspects of the health care system in a consistent manner, with a standardised terminology. The abbreviation is variously written with or without a hyphen ("WHO-FIC" or "WHOFIC"). The WHO-FIC consists of four components: the WHO-FIC Foundation, the Reference Classifications, the Derived Classifications, and the Related Classifications. The WHO-FIC Foundation, also called the Foundation Component, represents the entire WHO-FIC universe. It is a collection of over hundred thousand entities, also called classes or nodes. Entities are anything relevant to health care. They are used to describe diseases, disorders, body parts, bodily functions, reasons for visit, medical procedures, microbes, causes of death, social circumstances of the patient, and much more.

The Foundation Component is a multidimensional collection of entities. An entity can have multiple parents and child nodes. For example, pneumonia can be categorized as a lung infection, but also as a bacterial or viral infection (i.e. by site or by etiology). Thus, the node Pneumonia (entity id: 142052508) has two parents: Lung infections (entity id: 915779102) and Certain infectious or parasitic diseases (entity id: 1435254666). The Pneumonia node in turn has various children, including Bacterial pneumonia (entity id: 1323682030) and Viral pneumonia (entity id: 1024154490).

The Foundation Component is the common core on which all Reference and Derived Classifications are based. The WHO-FIC contains three Reference Classifications: the ICD-11 MMS (see below), the ICF, and the ICHI. Derived Classifications are based on the three Reference Classifications, and are usually tailored for a particular specialty. For example, the ICD-O is a Derived Classification used in oncology. Each node of the Foundation has a unique entity id, which remains the same in all Reference and Derived Classifications, guaranteeing consistency. Related Classifications are complementary, and cover specialty areas not covered elsewhere in the WHO-FIC. For example, the International Classification of Nursing Practice (ICNP), draws on terms from the Foundation Component, but also uses terms specific for nursing not found in the Foundation.

A classification can be represented as a tabular list, which is a "flat" hierarchical tree of categories. In this tree, all entities can only have a single parent, and therefore must be mutually exclusive of each other. Such a classification is also called a linearization.

=== ICD-11 MMS ===
The ICD-11 MMS is the main Reference Classification of the WHO-FIC, and the primary linearization of the Foundation Component. The ICD-11 MMS is commonly referred to as simply "the ICD-11". The "MMS" part was added to differentiate the ICD-11 entities in the Foundation from those in the Classification. The ICD-11 MMS does not contain all classes from the Foundation ICD-11, and also adds some classes from the ICF. MMS stands for Mortality and Morbidity Statistics. The abbreviation is variously written with or without a hyphen between 11 and MMS ("ICD-11 MMS" or "ICD-11-MMS").

The ICD-11 MMS consists of approximately 85,000 entities. Entities can be chapters, blocks or categories. A chapter is a top level entity of the hierarchy; the MMS contains 28 of them (see Chapters section below). A block is used to group related categories or blocks together. A category can be anything that is relevant to health care. Every category has a unique, alphanumeric code called an ICD-11 code, or just ICD code. Chapters and blocks never have ICD-11 codes, and therefore cannot be diagnosed. An ICD-11 code is not the same as an entity id.

The ICD-11 MMS takes the form of a "flat" hierarchical tree. As aforementioned, the entities in this linearization can only have a single parent, and therefore must be mutually exclusive of each other. To make up for this limitation, the hierarchy of the MMS contains gray nodes. These nodes appear as children in the hierarchy, but actually have a different parent node. They originally belong to a different block or chapter, but are also listed elsewhere because of overlap. For example, Pneumonia (CA40) has two parents in the Foundation: "Lung infections" (site) and "Certain infectious or parasitic diseases" (etiology). In the MMS, Pneumonia is categorized in the "Lung infections", with a gray node in "Certain infectious or parasitic diseases". The same goes for injuries, poisonings, neoplasms, and developmental anomalies, which can occur in almost any part of the body. They each have their own chapters, but their categories also have gray nodes in the chapters of the organs they affect. For instance, the blood cancers, including all forms of leukemia, are in the "Neoplasms" chapter, but they are also displayed as gray nodes in the chapter "Diseases of the blood or blood-forming organs".

The ICD-11 MMS also contains residual categories, or residual nodes. These are the "Other specified" and "Unspecified" categories. The former can be used to code conditions that do not fit with any of the more specific MMS entities, the latter can be used when necessary information may not be available in the source documentation. The ICD-11 Reference Guide advises that health care workers always aim to include the most specific level of detail possible, either with one code or multiple codes. In the ICD-11 Browser, residual nodes are displayed in a maroon color. Residual categories are not in the Foundation, and therefore do not have an entity ID. Thus, in the MMS, they are the only categories with derivative entity IDs: their IDs are the same as their parent nodes, with "/other" or "/unspecified" tagged at the end. Their ICD codes always end with Y for "Other specified" categories, or Z for "Unspecified" categories (e.g. 1C4Y and 1C4Z).

Codes can include 'inclusions'. These are terms or conditions which are judged important or commonly used in relation to that code.

== Usage ==
ICD-11 is a digital-first classification that supports straightforward single-code assignment for routine use. Where additional detail is required, post-coordination allows code clusters (stem plus extension codes or also stem plus stem codes with or without extension codes) to be created; the Browser and Coding Tool guide users through these combinations.

ICD-11 provides a REST and FHIR-compliant multilingual API and embeds a web-based Coding Tool in the Browser for everyday coding. Tooling includes search, clustering of stem and extension codes, and NLP-assisted features to reduce manual lookup and improve accuracy. ICD-11 with all its tools can be downloaded and used on local computers in Docker, or as a Windows or Linux server. Code samples facilitate integration in existing software. Documentation on the above, the ICD API and some additional tools for integration into third-party applications can be found at the ICD API home page.

The WHO has released spreadsheets that can be used to link and convert ICD-10 codes to those of the ICD-11. They can be downloaded from the ICD-11 MMS browser. Since 2017, WHO and SNOMED International are exploring ways of funding and governance in relation to formulating a bidirectional map between SNOMED CT and ICD-11. No deadlines for agreements, start of the work, or availability of any map has been communicated as of 2025.

The ICD-11 Foundation, and consequently the MMS, are updated annually, similarly to the ICD-10. The first stable version was released on 18 June 2018. On 16 February 2026, the Foundation and the MMS received its eight update (and ninth stable release overall).

== Chapters ==
Below is a table of all chapters of the ICD-11 MMS, the primary linearization of the Foundation Component.

#	Range	Chapter	#	Range	Chapter
1	1A00–1H0Z	Certain infectious or parasitic diseases	15	FA00–FC0Z	Diseases of the musculoskeletal system or connective tissue
2	2A00–2F9Z	Neoplasms	16	GA00–GC8Z	Diseases of the genitourinary system
3	3A00–3C0Z	Diseases of the blood or blood-forming organs	17	HA00–HA8Z	Conditions related to sexual health
4	4A00–4B4Z	Diseases of the immune system	18	JA00–JB6Z	Pregnancy, childbirth or the puerperium
5	5A00–5D46	Endocrine, nutritional or metabolic diseases	19	KA00–KD5Z	Certain conditions originating in the perinatal period
6	6A00–6E8Z	Mental, behavioural or neurodevelopmental disorders	20	LA00–LD9Z	Developmental anomalies
7	7A00–7B2Z	Sleep-wake disorders	21	MA00–MH2Y	Symptoms, signs or clinical findings, not elsewhere classified
8	8A00–8E7Z	Diseases of the nervous system	22	NA00–NF2Z	Injury, poisoning or certain other consequences of external causes
9	9A00–9E1Z	Diseases of the visual system	23	PA00–PL2Z	External causes of morbidity or mortality
10	AA00–AC0Z	Diseases of the ear or mastoid process	24	QA00–QF4Z	Factors influencing health status or contact with health services
11	BA00–BE2Z	Diseases of the circulatory system	25	RA00–RA26	Codes for special purposes
12	CA00–CB7Z	Diseases of the respiratory system	26	SA00–SJ3Z	Supplementary Chapter Traditional Medicine Conditions - Module I
13	DA00–DE2Z	Diseases of the digestive system	V	VA00–VC50	Supplementary section for functioning assessment
14	EA00–EM0Z	Diseases of the skin	X	XA0060–XY9U	Extension Codes

Unlike the ICD-10 codes, the ICD-11 MMS codes never contain the letters I or O, to prevent confusion with the numbers 1 and 0.

== Changes ==
Below is a summary of notable changes in the ICD-11 MMS compared to the ICD-10.

=== General ===
The ICD-11 MMS features a more flexible coding structure. In the ICD-10, every code starts with a letter, followed by a two digit number (e.g. P35), creating 99 slots, excluding subcategories and blocks. This proved enough for most chapters, but four are so voluminous that their categories span multiple letters: Chapter I (A00–B99), Chapter II (C00.0–D48.9), Chapter XIX (S00–T98), and Chapter XX (V01–Y98). In the ICD-11 MMS, there is a single first character for every chapter. The codes of the first nine chapters begin with the numbers 1 to 9, while the next nineteen chapters start with the letters A to X. The letters I and O are not used, to prevent confusion with the numbers 1 and 0. The chapter character is then followed by a letter, a number, and a fourth character that starts as a number (0–9, e.g. KA80) and may then continue as a letter (A–Z, e.g. KA8A). The WHO opted for a forced number as the third character to prevent the spelling of "undesirable words". In the ICD-10, each entity within a chapter either has a code (e.g. P35) or a code range (e.g. P35–P39). The latter is a block. In the ICD-11 MMS, blocks never have codes, and not every entity necessarily has a code, although each entity does have a unique id.

In the ICD-10, the next level of the hierarchy is indicated in the code by a dot and a single number (e.g. P35.2). This is the lowest available level in the ICD-10 hierarchy, causing an artificial limitation of 10 subcategories per code (.0 to .9). In the ICD-11 MMS, this limitation no longer exists: after 0–9, the list may continue with A–Z (e.g. KA62.0 – KA62.A). Then, following the first character after the dot, a second character may be used in the next level of the hierarchy (e.g. KA40.00 – KA40.08). This level is currently the lowest appearing in the MMS. The large amount of unused coding space in the MMS allows for updates to be made without having to change the other categories, ensuring that codes remain stable.

The ICD-11 features five new chapters. The third chapter of the ICD-10, "Diseases of the blood and blood-forming organs and certain disorders involving the immune mechanism", has been split in two: "Diseases of the blood or blood-forming organs" (chapter 3) and "Diseases of the immune system" (chapter 4). The other new chapters are "Sleep-wake disorders" (chapter 7), "Conditions related to sexual health" (chapter 17, see section), and "Supplementary Chapter Traditional Medicine Conditions - Module I" (chapter 26, see section).

=== Mental disorders ===
==== Overview ====
The following mental disorders have been newly added to the ICD-11, but were already included in the American ICD-10-CM adaption: Binge eating disorder (ICD-11: 6B82; ICD-10-CM: F50.81), Bipolar type II disorder (ICD-11: 6A61; ICD-10-CM: F31.81), Body dysmorphic disorder (ICD-11: 6B21; ICD-10-CM: F45.22), Excoriation disorder (ICD-11: 6B25.1; ICD-10-CM: F42.4), Frotteuristic disorder (ICD-11: 6D34; ICD-10-CM: F65.81), Hoarding disorder (ICD-11: 6B24; ICD-10-CM: F42.3), and Intermittent explosive disorder (ICD-11: 6C73; ICD-10-CM: F63.81).

The following mental disorders have been newly added to the ICD-11, and are not in the ICD-10-CM: Avoidant/restrictive food intake disorder (6B83), Body integrity dysphoria (6C21), Catatonia (486722075), Complex post-traumatic stress disorder (6B41), Gaming disorder (6C51), Olfactory reference disorder (6B22), and Prolonged grief disorder (6B42).

Other notable changes include:

- Distinct personality disorders have been collapsed into a single Personality disorder diagnosis, using a dimensional (as opposed to categorical) model; see Personality disorders section.
- All subtypes of Schizophrenia (e.g. paranoid, hebephrenic, catatonic) have been removed. Instead, a dimensional model is used with the category Symptomatic manifestations of primary psychotic disorders (6A25), which allows the coding for Positive symptoms (6A25.0), Negative symptoms (6A25.1), Depressive symptoms (6A25.2), Manic symptoms (6A25.3), Psychomotor symptoms (6A25.4), and Cognitive symptoms (6A25.5).
- Persistent mood disorders (F34), which consists of Cyclothymia (F34.0) and Dysthymia (F34.1), have been deleted. Cyclothymia has been categorized under bipolar and related disorders (6A62), while dysthymia has been categorized under depressive disorders (6A72).
- The ICD-10 differentiates between Phobic anxiety disorders (F40), such as Agoraphobia (F40.0), and Other anxiety disorders (F41), such as Generalized anxiety disorder (F41.1). The ICD-11 merges both groups together as Anxiety or fear-related disorders (1336943699).
- All Pervasive developmental disorders (F84) are merged into one category, Autism spectrum disorder (6A02), except for Rett syndrome, which is moved to the developmental anomalies chapter (LD90.4).
- Hyperkinetic disorders (F90) is renamed Attention deficit hyperactivity disorder (6A05), and a distinction in subtypes is made between predominantly inattentive (6A05.0), predominantly hyperactive-impulsive (6A05.1), and combined (6A05.2). Hyperkinetic conduct disorder (F90.1) has been removed.
- Acute stress reaction (F43.0) has been moved out of the mental disorder chapter, and placed in the chapter "Factors influencing health status or contact with health services" (QE84). Thus, in the ICD-11, Acute stress reaction is no longer considered a mental disorder.

==== ICD-11 CDDR ====
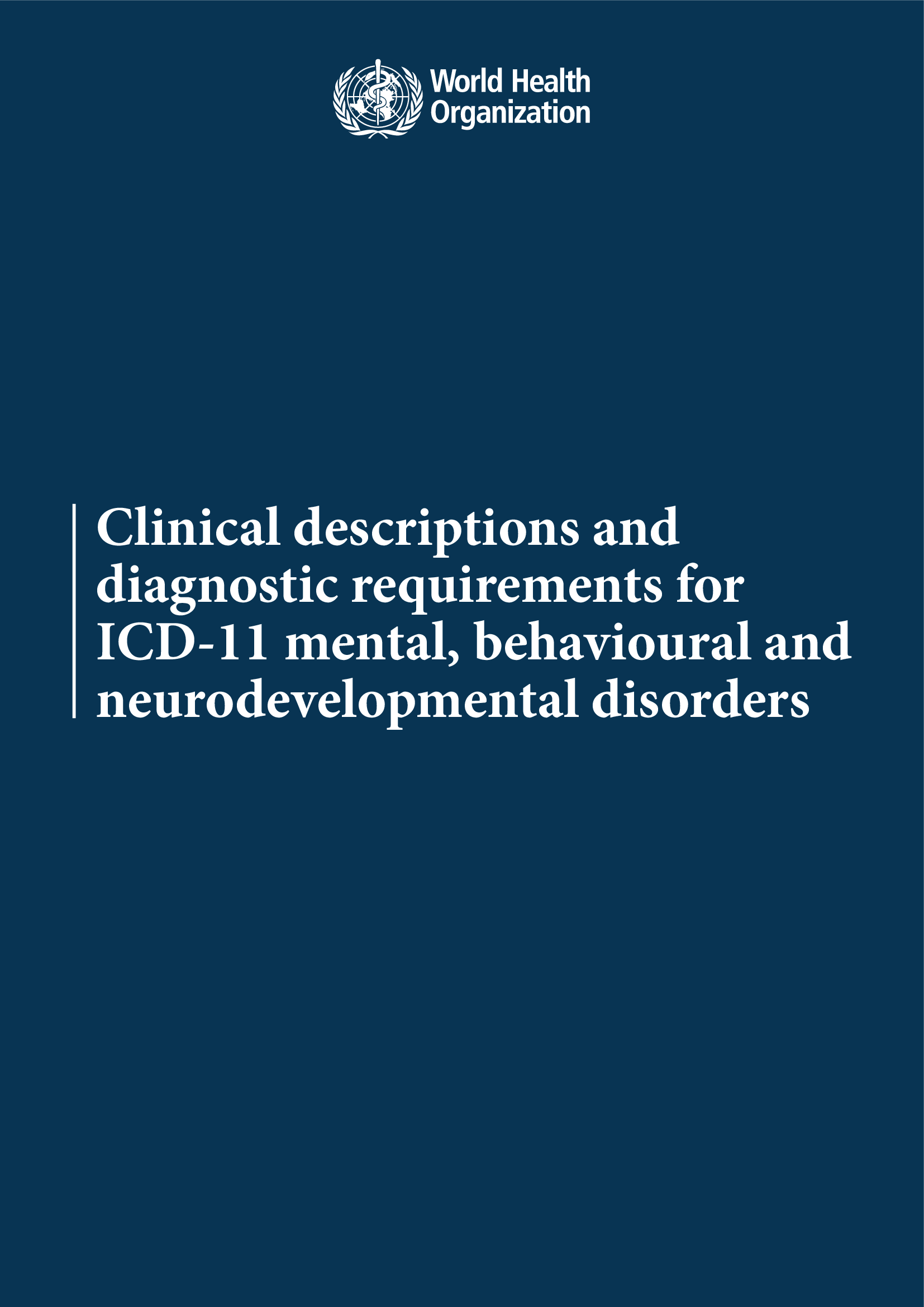
Book cover of the ICD-11 CDDR

Following an extensive, years-long revision process involving nearly 15,000 clinicians from 155 countries, the WHO developed the ICD-11 CDDG (Clinical Descriptions and Diagnostic Guidelines), later renamed the ICD-11 CDDR (Clinical Descriptions and Diagnostic Requirements). The CDDR is a comprehensive diagnostic manual for identifying and measuring mental illnesses with a uniform terminology, similar to the DSM-5. The ICD-11 CDDR was developed around the same time as the DSM-5, and the work groups of both projects regularly met to discuss their efforts. The CDDR and the DSM-5 are similar, but not identical. The ICD-11 CDDR is the successor to the ICD-10 CDDG, which was first released in 1992 and was also known as the "Blue Book". The CDDR is integrated into the ICD-11, and can be viewed in the ICD-11 Browser. On 8 March 2024, the CDDR was also released in e-book form – it can be downloaded for free from the WHO's website.

==== Personality disorder ====
The diagnostic framework for personality disorder (PD) in the ICD-11 is an implementation of a dimensional model of personality disorders, meaning that individuals are assessed along continuous trait dimensions, with personality disorders reflecting extreme or maladaptive variants of traits that are continuous with normal personality functioning, and classified according to both severity of dysfunction and prominent trait domain specifiers. The ICD-11 classification of personality disorders differs substantially from the one in the previous edition, ICD-10; all distinct PDs have been merged into one: personality disorder, which can be coded as mild, moderate, severe, or severity unspecified.

Severity is determined by the level of distress experienced and degree of impairment in day-to-day activities as a result of difficulties in aspects of self-functioning, (e.g., identity, self-worth and agency) and interpersonal relationships (e.g., desire and ability for close relationships and ability to handle conflicts), as well as behavioral, cognitive, and emotional dysfunctions. There is also an additional category called personality difficulty, which can be used to describe personality traits that are problematic, but do not meet the diagnostic criteria for a PD. A personality disorder or difficulty can be specified by one or more of the following prominent personality traits or patterns: Negative affectivity, Detachment, Dissociality, Disinhibition, and Anankastia. In addition to the traits, a Borderline pattern – similar in nature to borderline personality disorder – may be specified.

==== Gaming disorder ====
Gaming disorder (6C51) has been newly added to the ICD-11, and placed in the group "Disorders due to addictive behaviours", alongside Gambling disorder (6C50). The latter was called Pathological gambling (F63.0) in the ICD-10. Aside from Gaming disorder, the ICD-11 also features Hazardous gaming (QE22), an ancillary category that can be used to identify problematic gaming which does not rise to the level of a disorder.

Although a majority of scholars supported the inclusion of Gaming disorder (GD), a significant number did not. Aarseth et al. stated that the evidence base which this decision relied upon is of low quality, that the diagnostic criteria of gaming disorder are rooted in substance use and gambling disorder even though they are not the same, that no consensus exist on the definition and assessment of GD, and that a pre-defined category would lock research in a confirmatory approach. Rooij et al. questioned if what was called "gaming disorder" is in fact a coping strategy for underlying problems, such as depression, social anxiety, or ADHD. They also asserted moral panic, fueled by sensational media stories, and stated that the category could be stigmatizing people who are simply engaging in a very immersive hobby. Bean et al. wrote that the GD category caters to false stereotypes of gamers as physically unfit and socially awkward, and that most gamers have no problems balancing their expected social roles outside games with those inside.

In support of the GD category, Lee et al. agreed that there were major limitations of the existing research, but that this actually necessitates a standardized set of criteria, which would benefit studies more than self-developed instruments for evaluating problematic gaming. Saunders et al. argued that gaming addiction should be in the ICD-11 just as much as gambling addiction and substance addiction, citing functional neuroimaging studies which show similar brain regions being activated, and psychological studies which show similar antecedents (risk factors). Király and Demetrovics did not believe that a GD category would lock research into a confirmatory approach, noting that the ICD is regularly revised and characterized by permanent change. They wrote that moral panic around gamers does indeed exist, but that this is not caused by a formal diagnosis. Rumpf et al. noted that stigmatization is a risk not specific to GD alone. They agreed that GD could be a coping strategy for an underlying disorder, but that in this debate, "comorbidity is more often the rule than the exception". For example, a person can have an alcohol dependence due to PTSD. In clinical practice, both disorders need to be diagnosed and treated. Rumpf et al. also warned that the lack of a GD category might jeopardize insurance reimbursement of treatments.

The DSM-5 (2013) features a similar category called Internet Gaming Disorder (IGD). However, due to the controversy over its definition and inclusion, it is not included in its main body of mental diagnoses, but in the additional chapter "Conditions for Further Study". Disorders in this chapter are meant to encourage research and are not intended for clinical use.

=== Burn-out ===
In May 2019, a number of media incorrectly reported that burn-out was newly added to the ICD-11. In reality, burn-out is also in the ICD-10 (Z73.0), albeit with a short, one-sentence definition only. The ICD-11 features a longer summary, and specifically notes that the category should only be used in an occupational context. Furthermore, it should only be applied when mood disorders (6A60–6A8Z), Disorders specifically associated with stress (6B40–6B4Z), and Anxiety or fear-related disorders (6B00–6B0Z) have been ruled out.

As with the ICD-10, burn-out is not in the mental disorders chapter of the ICD-11, but in the chapter "Factors influencing health status or contact with health services", where it is coded QD85. In response to media attention over its inclusion, the WHO emphasized that the ICD-11 does not define burn-out as a mental disorder or a disease, but as an occupational phenomenon that undermines a person's well-being in the workplace.

=== Sexual health ===
Conditions related to sexual health is a new chapter in the ICD-11. The WHO decided to put the sexual disorders in a separate chapter due to "the outdated mind/body split". A number of ICD-10 categories, including sex disorders, were based on a Cartesian separation of "organic" (physical) and "non-organic" (mental) conditions. Those sexual dysfunctions classified as "non-organic" were included in the mental disorder chapter, while those classified as "organic" were for the most part listed in the chapter on diseases of the genitourinary system. The ICD-11 abolishes this separation, instead regarding sexual dysfunctions as involving an interaction between physical and psychological factors.

==== Sexual dysfunctions ====
Regarding general sexual dysfunction, the ICD-10 has three main categories: Lack or loss of sexual desire (F52.0), Sexual aversion and lack of sexual enjoyment (F52.1), and Failure of genital response (F52.2). The ICD-11 replaces these with two main categories: Hypoactive sexual desire dysfunction (HA00) and Sexual arousal dysfunction (HA01). The latter has two subcategories: Female sexual arousal dysfunction (HA01.0) and Male erectile dysfunction (HA01.1). The difference between Hypoactive sexual desire dysfunction and Sexual arousal dysfunction is that in the former, there is a reduced or absent desire for sexual activity. In the latter, there is insufficient physical and emotional response to sexual activity, even though there still is a desire to engage in satisfying sex. The WHO acknowledged that there is an overlap between desire and arousal, but they are not the same. Management should focus on their distinct features.

The ICD-10 contains the categories Vaginismus (N94.2), Nonorganic vaginismus (F52.5), Dyspareunia (N94.1), and Nonorganic dyspareunia (F52.6). As the WHO aimed to steer away from the aforementioned "outdated mind/body split", the organic and nonorganic disorders were merged. Vaginismus has been reclassified as Sexual pain-penetration disorder (HA20). Dyspareunia (GA12) has been retained. A related condition is Vulvodynia, which is in the ICD-9 (625.7), but not in the ICD-10. It has been re-added to the ICD-11 (GA34.02).

Sexual dysfunctions and Sexual pain-penetration disorder can be coded alongside a temporal qualifier, "lifelong" or "acquired", and a situational qualifier, "general" or "situational". Furthermore, the ICD-11 offers five aetiological qualifiers, or "Associated with..." categories, to further specify the diagnosis. For example, a woman who experiences sexual problems due to adverse effects of an SSRI antidepressant may be diagnosed with "Female sexual arousal dysfunction, acquired, generalised" (HA01.02) combined with "Associated with use of psychoactive substance or medication" (HA40.2).

==== Compulsive sexual behaviour disorder ====
Excessive sexual drive (F52.7) from the ICD-10 has been reclassified as Compulsive sexual behaviour disorder (CSBD, 6C72) and listed under Impulse control disorders. The WHO was unwilling to overpathologize sexual behaviour, stating that having a high sexual drive is not necessarily a disorder, so long as these people do not exhibit impaired control over their behavior, significant distress, or impairment in functioning. Kraus et al. noted that several people self-identify as "sex addicts", but on closer examination do not actually exhibit the clinical characteristics of a sexual disorder, although they may have other mental health problems, such as anxiety or depression. Experiencing shame and guilt about sex is not a reliable indicator of a sex disorder, Kraus et al. stated.

There was debate on whether CSBD should be considered a (behavioral) addiction. It has been claimed that neuroimaging shows overlap between compulsive sexual behavior and substance-use disorder through common neurotransmitter systems. Nonetheless, it was ultimately decided to place the disorder in the Impulse control disorders group. Kraus et al. wrote that, for the ICD-11, "a relatively conservative position has been recommended, recognizing that we do not yet have definitive information on whether the processes involved in the development and maintenance of [CSBD] are equivalent to those observed in substance use disorders, gambling and gaming".

==== Paraphilic disorders ====
Paraphilic disorders, called Disorders of sexual preference in the ICD-10, have remained in the mental disorders chapter, although they have gray nodes in the sexual health chapter. The ICD-10 categories Fetishism (F65.0) and Fetishistic transvestism (F65.1) were removed because, if they do not cause distress or harm, they are not considered mental disorders. Frotteuristic disorder (6D34) has been newly added.

==== Gender incongruence ====
Gender dysphoria of transgender people is called Gender incongruence in the ICD-11. In the ICD-10, the group Gender identity disorders (F64) consisted of three main categories: Transsexualism (F64.0), Dual-role transvestism (F64.1), and Gender identity disorder of childhood (F64.2). In the ICD-11, Dual-role transvestism was deleted due to a lack of public health or clinical relevance. Transsexualism was renamed Gender incongruence of adolescence or adulthood (HA60), and Gender identity disorder of childhood was renamed Gender incongruence of childhood (HA61).

In the ICD-10, the Gender identity disorders were placed in the mental disorders chapter, following what was customary at the time. Throughout the 20th century, both the ICD and the DSM approached transgender health from a psychopathological position, as transgender identity presents a discrepancy between someone's assigned sex and their gender identity. Since this may cause mental distress, it was consequently considered a mental disorder, with distress or discomfort being a core diagnostic feature. In the 2000s and 2010s, this notion became increasingly challenged, as the idea of viewing transgender people as having a mental disorder was believed by some to be stigmatizing. It has been suggested that distress and dysfunction among transgender people should be more appropriately viewed as the result of social rejection, discrimination, and violence toward individuals with gender variant appearance and behavior. Studies have shown transgender people to be at higher risk of developing mental health problems than other populations, but that health services aimed at transgender people are often insufficient or nonexistent. Since an official ICD code is usually needed to gain access to and reimbursement for gender-affirming care, the WHO found it ill-advised to remove transgender health from the ICD-11 altogether. It was therefore decided to transpose the concept from the mental disorders chapter to the new sexual health chapter.

=== Antimicrobial resistance and GLASS ===
The group related to coding antimicrobial resistance has been significantly expanded in the ICD-11 compared to the ICD-10. Also, the ICD-11 codes are more closely in line with the WHO's Global Antimicrobial Resistance Surveillance System (GLASS). Launched in October 2015, this project aims to track the growing worldwide resistance of malicious microbes (viruses, bacteria, fungi, and protozoa) against medication.

=== Traditional medicine ===
"Supplementary Chapter Traditional Medicine Conditions" is an additional chapter in the ICD-11, featuring concepts from different traditional medicine (TM) systems. While some countries had created national classification schemes corresponding to various alternative medicine systems, a unified international standard was lacking. This complicated data collection, making it more difficult for the WHO to comprehensively monitor the usage, safety, efficacy, and costs of TM practices.

This supplemental chapter describing TM practices initially contained one module, TM1. This module describes concepts and terminology that originated in the traditional medicine practices of China, Japan, Korea, and Vietnam.

In February 2025, a second module was added, TM2. This module features concepts related to Ayurveda, Siddha, and Unani. A third module, covering homeopathy, is planned, as well as a fourth module covering "other TM systems with independent diagnostic conditions". As of June 2026, TM3 and TM4 have yet to be released.

During the 1970s, TM became a topic of increasing interest in Europe and North America. On 19 May 1977, the WHO passed a resolution approving the initiation of TM-related training and research, which is considered the official beginning of the WHO's endorsement of TM. The declaration of Alma-Ata in 1978 mentioned the role of traditional practitioners in health care. In 1984, the WHO released the first version of the Standard Acupuncture Nomenclature. The WHO Traditional Medicine Strategy 2002–2005 outlined a plan to, among other things, integrate TM with national health care systems, expand the knowledge base about TM, and enhance its safety, efficacy, and quality. The WHO International Standard Terminologies on Traditional Medicine in the Western Pacific Region (2007), or simply IST, (Note: The abbreviation "IST" is used in official WHO documentation. Other abbreviations that have been used are "WHO-IST" and "WHO ISTT".) defines terms related to qi, acupuncture, moxibustion, cupping, Chinese herbology, and other concepts within traditional Chinese medicine (TCM). Elaborating on the IST, the WHO developed the International Classification of Traditional Medicine (ICTM), (Note: Because the scope of the WHO's efforts regarding the TM chapter was initially on traditional East Asian medicine, the ICTM was at first called the "International Classification of Diseases of East Asian Traditional Medicine" (ICEATM). In 2006, the classification was officially named ICTM to reflect the intention that its scope was international, not just (East) Asian. Another term that is sometimes used is "International Classification of Traditional Medicine – China, Japan, Korea" (ICTM-CJK).) the contents of which form Chapter 26 of the ICD-11.

The decision to include TM in the ICD-11 has been criticized, because it is often alleged to be pseudoscience. Editorials by Nature and Scientific American admitted that some TM techniques and herbs have shown effectiveness or potential, but that others are pointless, or even outright harmful. They wrote that the inclusion of the TM-chapter is at odds with the scientific, evidence-based methods usually employed by the WHO. Both editorials accused the government of China of pushing the WHO to incorporate traditional Chinese medicine, a global, billion-dollar market in which China plays a leading role. In Forbes, Steven Salzberg wrote: "There's no legitimate reason to use terms such as "Chinese" medicine, or American, Italian, Spanish, Indian, or [insert your favorite nationality] medicine. There's just medicine – if a treatment works, then it's medicine. If something doesn't work, then it's not medicine and we shouldn't sell it to people with false claims." The WHO has stated that the TM chapter "is neither judging nor endorsing the scientific validity of any Traditional Medicine practice", and that its inclusion is primarily intended for statistical purposes, aiding research and evaluation. The ICD-11 Reference Guide recommends the TM-codes "be used in conjunction with the Western Medicine concepts of ICD-11 chapters 1-25".

=== Other changes ===
Other notable changes in the ICD-11 include:

- Stroke is now classified as a neurological disorder instead of a disease of the circulatory system.
- Allergies are now coded under diseases of the immune system.
- In the ICD-10, a distinction was made between Sleep disorders (G47), included in nervous system diseases chapter, and Nonorganic sleep disorders (F51), included in the mental disorders chapter. In the ICD-11, they are merged and placed into a new chapter called sleep-wake disorders, since the separation between organic (physical) and non-organic (mental) disorders is considered obsolete.
- "Supplementary section for functioning assessment" is an additional chapter that provides codes for use in the WHO Disability Assessment Schedule 2.0 (WHODAS 2.0), the model disability survey (MDS), and the ICF.
