= OPS-301 =

German healthcare procedure classification

OPS (in earlier versions: OPS-301), the Operationen- und Prozedurenschlüssel (Operation and Procedure Classification System) is the German modification of the International Classification of Procedures in Medicine (ICPM). For German hospitals it is currently the official coding system for medical procedures. Apart from its use for clinical controlling and performance statistics it is a basis for inpatient claims processing within the German Diagnosis-related Groups (G-DRG) system. Yearly OPS releases are produced by DIMDI (Deutsches Institut für Medizinische Dokumentation und Information). Besides OPS, G-DRG also requires disease codes based on ICD-10-GM is (the German Modification of the current WHO standard).

== History ==
Basis for OPS was the Dutch ICPM-DE, from which the procedure classification OPS-301 according to §301 SGB V was created. Version 1.0 was published in October 1994 and became effective on January 1, 1995. Originally a subset of ICPM, OPS-301 has been expanded by a significant number of national codes since version 2.0 (effective in 2001). The OPS classification gained an enormous importance with the introduction of the G-DRG flat rate system in 2004.

In 2004, the suffix "-301" was omitted, because the application of OPS was no longer limited to the cases regulated by §301 SGB V, being extended to outpatient procedures in hospitals (§115b SGB V) and outpatient care by private physicians (§295 SGB V).

== Properties and metrics of OPS 2008 ==
=== General ===
- 6 chapters, not consecutively numbered
- 65 section headings (e.g., 5–29 to 5-31: Operations on pharynx, larynx and trachea)
- 230 three-digit classes (e.g. 5-31: Other operations on larynx and operations on trachea)
- 1400 four-digit classes(e.g., 5-314: Excision, resection and destruction (of diseased tissue) of the trachea
- 7800 five-digit classes (e.g. 5–314.1: resection
- About 18 700 additional six-digit classes (e.g. 5–314.11: With end-to-end anastomosis)
- Notation: first three characters numeric, fourth character alphanumeric, fifth and sixth character alphanumeric (with letters for residual classes: "x" : any other procedure, "y": unspecified)
- Classification criteria, first of all topographical (not by clinical specialty)
- Not all digits in the four-digit classification are used (for assuring comparability with the original ICPM)
- More than one code required in case of changes of the surgical site or intra-operative complications
- Inclusion and exclusion rules, further information at the highest possible level in the hierarchy
- Mono-hierarchical classification with respect to the physiology

=== Diagnostic procedures ===
- 1: Diagnostic procedures
  - 1-10...1-10: physical examination
  - 1-20...1-33: Study of individual body systems
  - 1-40...1-49: Biopsy without incision
  - 1-50...1-58: Biopsy with incision
  - 1-61...1-69: Diagnostic endoscopy
  - 1-70...1-79: Function tests
  - 1-84...1-85: Exploratory diagnostic measures
  - 1-90...1-99: Other diagnostic measures

=== Radiology ===
- 3: Radiology
  - 3-03...3-05: Ultrasound
  - 3-10...3-13: Projection radiography
  - 3-20...3-26: Computed tomography (CT)
  - 3-30...3-30: Optical techniques
  - 3-60...3-69: Representation of the vascular system
  - 3-70...3-76: Nuclear medicine diagnostic procedure
    - 3-70: Scintigraphy
    - 3-72: Single-photon emission computed tomography (SPECT)
    - 3-73: Single-photon emission computed tomography with computed tomography (SPECT / CT)
    - 3-74: Positron emission tomography (PET) with full-ring scanner
    - 3-75: Positron emission tomography with computed tomography (PET / CT)
    - 3-76: Probe measurements and incorporation
  - 3-80...3-84: magnetic resonance imaging (MRI)
  - 3-90...3-90: Other imaging techniques
  - 3-99...3-99: Additional information on imaging techniques

=== Operations ===
- 5: Operations
  - 5-01...5-05: Operations on the nervous system (neurosurgery)
  - 5-06...5-07: Operations on endocrine glands (endocrine surgery)
  - 5-08...5-16: Operations on the eye (eye surgery)
  - 5-18...5-20: Operations on the ear
  - 5-21...5-22: Operations on the nose and paranasal sinuses
  - 5-23...5-28: Operations on mouth and face
  - 5-29...5-31: Operations on pharynx, larynx and trachea
  - 5-32...5-34: Operations on lung and bronchus
  - 5-35...5-37: Heart surgery
  - 5-38...5-39: Operations on the blood vessels (vascular surgery)
  - 5-40...5-41: Operations on the hematopoietic and lymphatic system
  - 5-42...5-54: Operations on the digestive tract (digestive system surgery)
  - 5-55...5-59: Operations on the urinary system
  - 5-60...5-64: Operations on the male genital organs
  - 5-65...5-71: Operations on the female genital organs
  - 5-72...5-75: Obstetric surgery
  - 5-76...5-77: Operations on the jaw and facial bones
  - 5-78...5-86: Operations on the musculoskeletal system
  - 5-87...5-88: Operations on the breast
  - 5-89...5-92: Operations on the skin and subcutaneous tissue
  - 5-93...5-99: Additional information on operations

=== Drugs ===
- 6: Drugs

=== Non-surgical therapeutic measures ===
- 8: Non-surgical therapeutic measures
  - 8-01...8-02: Administration of medications and nutritional and therapeutic injection
  - 8-03...8-03: Immunotherapy
  - 8-10...8-11: Removal of foreign material and debris
  - 8-12...8-13: Manipulation of digestive tract and urinary tract
  - 8-14...8-17: Therapeutic catheterization, aspiration, and irrigation
  - 8-19...8-19: Units
  - 8-20...8-22: Closed reduction and correction of deformities
  - 8-31...8-39: Immobilization and special storage
  - 8-40...8-41: Bone extension and other extension methods
  - 8-50...8-51: Tamponade of bleeding and manipulation of fetus or uterus
  - 8-52...8-54: Radiotherapy, nuclear medicine therapy, and chemotherapy
  - 8-55...8-60: Frührehabilitative and physical therapy
  - 8-63...8-66: Electrical stimulation, electrical therapy, and duration of treatment by focused ultrasound
  - 8-70...8-72: Measures for the respiratory system
  - 8-77...8-77: Measures in the resuscitation
  - 8-80...8-85: Measures for the circulation
  - 8-86...8-86: Therapy with special cells and blood components
  - 8-90...8-91: Anesthesia and pain management
  - 8-92...8-93: Patient monitoring
  - 8-97...8-98: Complex treatment
  - 8-99...8-99: Additional information about non-surgical therapeutic measures

=== Additional measures ===
- 9: Additional measures
  - 9-20...9-20: Nursing care of patients
  - 9-26...9-28: Birth, accompanying measures, and treatment for infertility
  - 9-31...9-32: Phoniatrics and pedaudiological therapy
  - 9-40...9-41: psychosocial, psychological, neuropsychological and psychotherapeutic treatment
  - 9-50...9-50: Preventive measures
  - 9-60...9-64: Treatment of mental and psychosomatic disorders and behavioral disorders in adults
  - 9-65...9-69: Treatment of mental and psychosomatic disorders and behavioral disorders in children and adolescents
  - 9-98...9-99: Other complementary measures and information

== See also ==
- Procedure codes
