= Nappi =

Nappi may refer to:

== People ==
- Chiara Nappi (1951), Italian physicist
- Diego Nappi (born 2007), Italian sprinter
- Francesco Nappi (bishop) (1584–1628), Roman Catholic prelate
- Francesco Nappi (1565–1630s), Italian painter
- Laura Nappi (born 1949), Italian retired sprinter
- Marco Nappi (1966), Italian former footballer
- Michele Nappi (1951), Italian retired footballer
- Rudy Nappi (1923–2015), American illustrator
- Valentina Nappi (1990), italian pornographic film actress and model

== Places ==
- Nappi, Guyana, a village in Guyana

== Other ==
National Pharmaceutical Product Index
