= Classificatie van verrichtingen =

Dutch health coding system

Classificatie van verrichtingen is a Dutch system of health coding procedures.

It is based on ICD-9-CM (the International Classification of Diseases, Clinical Modification), but not identical to it.

It is abbreviated "CvV".
