= ICD-10-CM =

Diagnosis code system for use in the U.S.

ICD-10 Clinical Modification
- International Classification of Diseases, Tenth Revision, Clinical Modification
- Abbreviation: ICD-10-CM
- Status: Active
- Year started: 2008
- First published: 2015
- Organization: National Center for Health Statistics
- Base standards: ICD-10
- Related standards: ICD-10 Procedure Coding System
- Domain: Medical classification
- Website: www.cdc.gov/nchs/icd/icd-10-cm/index.html

The ICD-10 Clinical Modification (ICD-10-CM) is a set of diagnosis codes used in the United States of America. It was developed by a component of the U.S. Department of Health and Human services, as an adaptation of the ICD-10 with authorization from the World Health Organization. In 2015, ICD-10-CM replaced ICD-9-CM as the federally mandated classification. Annual updates are provided.

== Development ==
Since 1979, the US had required ICD-9-CM codes for Medicare and Medicaid claims, and most of the rest of the medical industry in the US followed suit. On January 1, 1999, the ICD-10 (without clinical extensions) was adopted for reporting mortality, however, ICD-9-CM continued to be used for morbidity.

During that time, the U.S. National Center for Health Statistics (NCHS) received permission from the WHO to create a clinical modification of the ICD-10.

ICD-10-CM adapted ICD-10 in the following ways:

- Allow the capture of information for ambulatory and managed care encounters
- Expand available injury codes
- Combine codes for diagnosis/symptoms to reduce the number of codes needed to describe a problem fully
- Provide additional sixth and seventh digit classifications
- Add classifications specific to laterality
- Refine classification for increased data granularity

== Adoption ==
Adoption of ICD-10-CM was slow. On August 21, 2008, the US Department of Health and Human Services (HHS) proposed new code sets to be used for reporting diagnoses and procedures on health care transactions. Under the proposal, the ICD-9-CM code sets would be replaced with the ICD-10-CM code sets, effective October 1, 2013. On April 17, 2012, the Department of Health and Human Services (HHS) published a proposed rule that would delay the compliance date for the ICD-10-CM and PCS by 12 months-from October 1, 2013, to October 1, 2014. Congress further delayed the implementation date to October 1, 2015, after it was inserted into the "Doc Fix" Bill without debate over the objections of many.

== Release ==
On October 1, 2015, ICD-10-CM replaced volumes 1 and 2 of ICD-9-CM, and ICD-10-PCS replaced volume 3.

=== Annual review ===
The ICD-10-CM code set is reviewed every year. The code set for the 2023 fiscal year applies to patient discharges and encounters between October 1, 2022, and September 30, 2023 (inclusive) – with the exception of four codes that were in effect from April 1, 2022.

== See also ==
- ICD-10 Procedure Coding System, the sister publication for coding procedures
- ICD-11
