= Federal Institute for Drugs and Medical Devices =

German medical regulatory agency

Coordinates: 50.7060°N 7.1367°E

- Bundesinstitut für Arzneimittel und Medizinprodukte (BfArM)

Agency overview
- Formed: 1 July 1994
- Jurisdiction: Government of Germany
- Headquarters: Bonn, Germany
- Employees: 1.002 (2025)
- Annual budget: €142.083 million (2026)
- Agency executive: Karl Broich, President
- Parent department: Federal Ministry of Health
- Website: Official English website

The Federal Institute for Drugs and Medical Devices (German: Bundesinstitut für Arzneimittel und Medizinprodukte – BfArM) is the medical regulatory body in Germany. It operates under the Federal Ministry of Health (BMG). It is headquartered in Bonn, Germany. Its president is Karl Broich.

== Portfolio ==
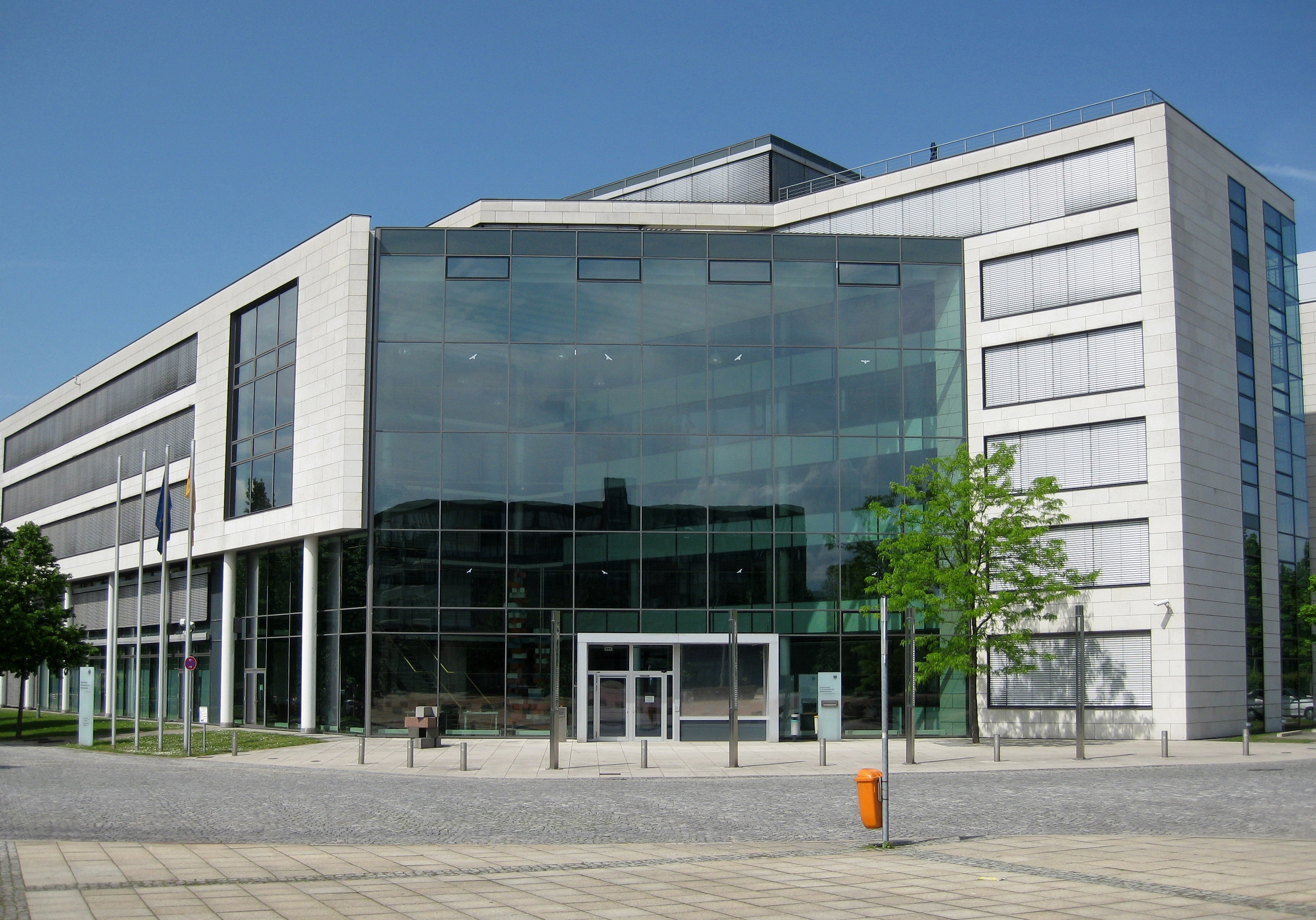
Headquarters in Bonn (2012)

The Federal Institute for Drugs and Medical Devices is one of the two independent federal higher authorities in the German health care sector alongside the Paul-Ehrlich-Institut (PEI) under the Federal Ministry of Health. It is headquartered in Bonn, Germany.

The core tasks of the BfArM as a regulatory authority include the approval and registration of medical devices and products, including drugs in the special therapeutic areas of herbalism and paraherbals, as well as the identification, assessment and defence against drug risks (pharmacovigilance).

The office of the German Pharmacopoeia Commission is based at the BfArM.

With the dissolution of the German Institute for Medical Documentation and Information (DIMDI) in May 2020, responsibility for the electronic sperm donor register was transferred to the BfArM, as was the publication and maintenance of medical classifications such as the International Statistical Classification of Diseases and Related Health Problems (ICD).

== History ==
The predecessor of the BfArM was the Institut für Arzneimittel, which was founded on 1 July 1975 as part of the former Federal Health Agency (BGA). The BfArM was established on 1 July 1994. When the government moved from Bonn to Berlin, the Berlin-Bonn Act provided for the relocation of the authority's headquarters from Berlin to Bonn as a compensatory measure for the federal city of Bonn.

In 2010, the Federal Institute for Drugs and Medical Devices announced that it would accept pure electronic filings (eCTD or NeeS) from mid-February 2010 onward (previously a full paper copy was required). Only those documents requiring signature would be required in paper.

In 2020, the Deutsches Institut für Medizinische Dokumentation und Information (DIMDI) or German Institute for Medical Documentation and Information was merged into the BfArM. It offered reliable medical knowledge via the internet, oversaw medical classifications, terminology for health telematics and was responsible for a Health Technology Assessment programme.

== See also ==
- Agence Nationale de Sécurité du Médicament et des Produits de Santé (ANSM), France
- Medicines and Healthcare products Regulatory Agency (MHRA), UK
- Food and Drug Administration (FDA), USA
- Medicinal Products
- Medical device
