= Drug identifier =

Drug identifiers include:

- Drug nomenclature
- Pharmaceutical codes
