= Tendon transfer =

Surgical procedure

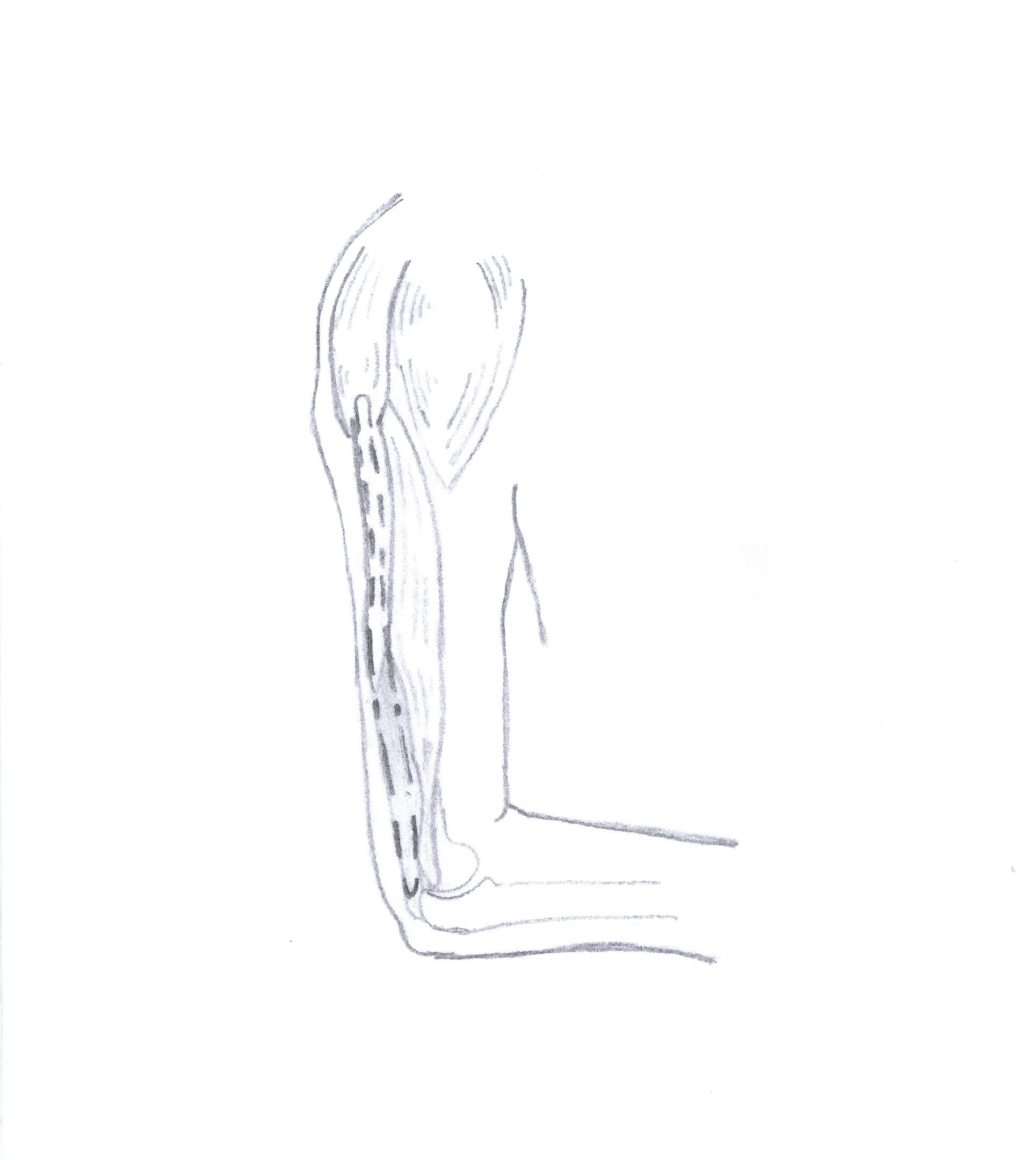
- Posterior deltoid-to-triceps tendon transfer to restore elbow extension
- ICD-10-PCS: 0LX
- ICD-9-CM: 82.56, 83.75
- MeSH: D013709

A tendon transfer is a surgical process in which the insertion of a tendon is moved, but the origin remains in the same location. Tendon transfer involves redistribution of muscle power, not recreation. Tendons are transferred at the distal attachment from lesser to more important functions so that the overall function is improved. Tendon transfers provide a substitute which can be permanent or temporary, when muscle function is lost either due to nerve injuries or injuries to the muscle/tendon unit. Tendon transfers are also performed to correct the imbalanced muscle tone due to spasticity resulting from injuries to the central nervous system.

== Principles ==
Preoperative evaluation of the patient is required to map out functional deficits, and determine which muscles are available for transfer. Time from injury, type of injury, and success of previous treatment should also be taken into account. Electrodiagnostic studies may be useful in determining the extent of motor loss and predicting the muscle recovery. It may also be useful to detect abnormal nerve pattern such as median-to-ulnar nerve anastomosis, which may influence the choice of transfer.

The donor muscle must have enough strength (work capacity) to duplicate the recipient function. The work capacity depends upon muscle fibre's length and cross sectional area, which are proportional to muscle mass and volume. In other words, a larger muscle produces more force and a longer muscle has a greater excursion. There are potential factors that may result in loss of muscle strength including postoperative adhesion, difference in vector of motion.

The donor tendon must also be expendable. In other words, it must not result in functional deficit after transfer. The remaining muscles must have enough level of strength to account for the loss of the original function of the donor muscle. Transfers can generally be classified into either power or positional transfers. Power transfers are done to perform motion, and therefore requires relatively more powerful donor muscles. Positional transfers, on the other hand, do not require powerful donors. The strength of the antagonist muscle should be similar to the donor to avoid overcorrection and to maintain correct posture. Tendon excursion, or distance a tendon travels upon movement, should be similar to that of the recipient to adequately restore the function.

Any transfer of a tendon for another function will generally lose one grade of power. For example, M4 muscle power grade will become M3. A single tendon should be used to restore a single function. Transfer of one tendon to restore multiple functions will compromise strength and movement.

== Medical uses ==
These are examples of commonly performed tendon transfers.

Radial nerve palsy transfer
Donor	Recipient	Function
Pronator teres	Extensor carpi radialis brevis	Wrist extension
Palmaris longus	Extensor pollicis longus	Thumb extension
Flexor Carpi Radialis	Extensor digitorum	Finger extension

Common peroneal nerve transfer
Donor	Recipient	Function
Tibialis posterior	Tibialis anterior	Dorsiflexion of foot
Flexor digitorum longus	Extensor digitorum longus and extensor hallucis longus	Digit extension and big toe extension

== History ==
Many of the lower extremity tendon transfers were performed during the nineteenth century to improve ambulation in polio patients due to post-poliomyelitis paralysis. In the beginning of the twentieth century, tendon transfers were used to correct congenital talipes equina. Tendon transfers were extensively performed during World Wars I and II to patients with upper extremity injuries.
