= TARMED =

TARMED is a system of procedure codes used in Switzerland.
