= National Pharmaceutical Product Index =

Medical database

The National Pharmaceutical Product Index or NAPPI is a comprehensive database of pharmaceutical codes for medical products classification used in South Africa. Each product has a unique NAPPI code which enables electronic data interchange throughout the health care delivery chain.

NAPPI is governed by the NAPPI Advisory Board (NAB), a non-profit organisation representing hospitals, medical schemes, medical scheme administrators, and medical and dental associations. MediKredit is responsible for the management and maintenance of the NAPPI Product File.
