= International Classification of Functioning, Disability and Health =

WHO classification of health and functioning

The International Classification of Functioning, Disability and Health (ICF) is a classification of the health components of functioning and disability.

The ICF received approval from all 191 World Health Organization (WHO) member states on May 22, 2001, during the 54th World Health Assembly. Its approval followed nine years of international revision efforts coordinated by WHO. WHO's initial classification for the effects of diseases, the International Classification of Impairments, Disabilities, and Handicaps (ICIDH), was created in 1980.

The ICF classification complements WHO's International Classification of Diseases-10th Revision (ICD), which contains information on diagnosis and health condition, but not on functional status. The ICD and ICF constitute the core classifications in the WHO Family of International Classifications (WHO-FIC).

== Overview ==
The ICF is structured around the following broad components:

- Body functions and structure
- Activities (related to tasks and actions by an individual) and participation (involvement in a life situation)
- Additional information on severity and environmental factors

Functioning and disability are viewed as a complex interaction between the health condition of the individual and the contextual factors of the environment as well as personal factors. The picture produced by this combination of factors and dimensions is of "the person in his or her world". The classification treats these dimensions as interactive and dynamic rather than linear or static. It allows for an assessment of the degree of disability, although it is not a measurement instrument. It is applicable to all people, whatever their health condition. The language of the ICF is neutral as to etiology, placing the emphasis on function rather than condition or disease. It also is carefully designed to be relevant across cultures as well as age groups and genders, making it highly appropriate for heterogeneous populations.

=== Impairments ===
The ICF identifies a variety of different possible impairments, including, but not limited to:

- Impairments of Body Functions
  - Mental Functions
  - Sensory Functions and Pain
  - Voice and Speech Functions
  - Functions of the Cardiovascular, Haematological, Immunological and Respiratory systems
  - Functions of the Digestive, Metabolic and Endocrine systems
  - Genitourinary and Reproductive Functions
  - Neuromusculoskeletal and Movement related Functions
  - Functions of the Skin and Related Structures
- Impairments of Body Structures
  - Structures of the Nervous system
  - The Eye, Ear and Related Structures
  - Structures involved in voice and speech
  - Structures of the Cardiovascular, Immunological and Respiratory System
  - Structures related to the Digestive, Metabolism and Endocrine systems
  - Structures related to Movement
  - Skin and Related Structures

As well, there are many subcategories to these impairments, such as Emotional functions being a sub-function of one's mental functions, or Weight maintenance being a subfunction of the Functions of the Digestive system. These subcategories are gauged either by the extent of the impairments on a level of 0-4 or as Not Specified or Not Applicable (such as Menstruation often not being applicable for a Male.) The level of impairment is graded as such:

Impairment Qualifier
Qualifier	Description	Extent of Impairments
0	No Impairment	Person does not have the impairment
1	Mild Impairment	Presents for less than a fourth of the time, is tolerable, and rarely happened over the last 30 days
2	Moderate Impairment	Presents for less than half the time, with intensity, interferes with day to day life, and happened occasionally over the last 30 days
3	Severe Impairment	Presents for over half the time, with intensity, disrupts day to day life, and frequently happened over the last 30 days
4	Complete Impairment	Presents for over 95% of the time, with intensity, totally disrupting day to day life, and which happens every day over the last 30 days
8	Not Specified	Insufficient information to specify impairment severity
9	Not applicable	Inappropriate to apply a particular code

As well, body structures are graded on a nature of the change as follows,

Nature of the change Qualifier
Qualifier	Description
0	No change in structure
1	Total absence
2	Partial apsence
3	Additional Part
4	Aberrant dimensions
5	Discontinuity
6	Deviating position
7	Qualitative changes in structure
8	Not specified
9	Not applicable

For clarity, the ICF further defines body functions as being both physiological and psychological, meaning that a disability that causes distress in one individual might not be a disability in another individual that experiences no psychological ill-effects therefrom.

=== Activity Limitations and Participation Restriction ===
Participation is the involvement in a life situation, meaning that a participation restriction would be any problem which a person experiences in life situations. Likewise, activity is the execution of a task or action by an individual, meaning that an activity limitation would be anything which would make executing such tasks more difficult. Some of these activity and participation domains are as follows:

- Learning and Applying Knowledge
- General Tasks and Demands
- Communication
- Mobility
- Self-care
- Domestic Life
- Interpersonal Interactions and Relationships
- Major Life Areas
- Community, Social and Civic Life

These are graded with the two qualifiers of Performance Extent of Participation Restriction and Capacity (without assistance) Extent of Activity limitation on a same scale as impairments are.

=== Environmental Factors ===
Finally, environmental factors are taken into consideration for both their possible facilitation of the disability and any barriers to which the disability may apply,

- Products and Technology
- Natural Environment and human made changes to environment
- Support and Relationships
- Attitudes
- Services, Systems and Policies

For example, a severe social anxiety disorder or schizophrenia may either be barriers to seeking support or services, as well as be possibly facilitated by the technology and relationships of the person in their consumption of harmful forms of social media. These are qualified on a level from 0-4 as follows,

Barriers and Facilitators Qualifiers
Qualifier	Barrier Description	Facilitator Description
0	No barriers	No facilitator
1	Mild barriers	Mild facilitator
2	Moderate barriers	Moderate facilitator
3	Severe barriers	Severe facilitator
4	Complete barriers	Complete facilitator

The environmental factors make up the entire physical, social and attitudinal environment in which people live and conduct their lives, including those specific to the individual. In this way, some disabilities can be existent by purely social factors, being both the sole facilitator to the disability, and a blocker toward other environmental factors. It is an interesting observation then that a cult could be considered a form of disabling group which is in-abled within its own environment.

== Benefits ==
There are benefits of using the ICF for both the patient and the health professional. A major advantage for the patient is the integration of the physical, mental, and social aspects of their health condition. All aspects of a person's life (development, participation and environment) are incorporated into the ICF instead of solely focusing on their diagnosis. A diagnosis reveals little about one's functional abilities. Diagnoses are important for defining the cause and prognosis, but identifying the limitations of function is often the information used to plan and implement interventions. Once a rehabilitation team is aware of the daily activities a client is required to participate in, the problem solving sequence set up by the ICF can be utilized. An occupational therapist, for example, would observe a patient performing their daily activities and note the patient's functional abilities. This information would then be used to determine the extent to which the individual's abilities can be improved through therapy and to what extent the environment can be changed to facilitate the individual's performance. Intervention at one level (current abilities) has the potential to prevent or modify events at a succeeding level (participation). For example, teaching a deaf child manual signs will foster effective interaction and increase one's participation with their family.

Rehabilitation therapists will be empowered with the ICF not only in their daily work with their patients, but also when working with other medical disciplines; hospitals and other health care administrations; health authorities and policy makers. All items are operationally defined with clear descriptions that can be applied to real life evaluations with clarity and ease. The language used in the ICF helps facilitate better communication between these groups of people.

== Clinical relevance ==
Knowing how a disease affects one's functioning enables better planning of services, treatment, and rehabilitation for persons with long-term disabilities or chronic conditions. The current ICF creates a more integrative understanding of health forming a comprehensive profile of an individual instead of focusing on one's disease, illness, or disability. The implications of using the ICF include an emphasis on the strengths of individuals, assisting individuals in participating more extensively in society by the use of interventions aimed at enhancing their abilities, and taking into consideration the environmental and personal factors that might hamper their participation. Qualifiers: The ICF qualifiers "may be best translated clinically as the levels of functioning seen in a standardized or clinic setting and in everyday environments". Qualifiers support standardization and the understanding of functioning in a multidisciplinary assessment. They enable all team members to quantify the extent of problems, even in areas of functioning where one is not a specialist. Without qualifiers codes have no inherent meaning. An impairment, limitation or restriction, is qualified from 0 (No problem; 0–4%), 1 (Mild problem: 5–24%), 2 (Moderate problem: 25–49%), 3 (Severe problem: 50–95%) to 4 (Complete problem: 96–100%). Environmental factors are quantified with a negative and positive scale denoting the extent to which the environment acts as a barrier or facilitator. For insurance purposes, the qualifiers can describe the effectiveness of treatment. One can interpret the decreasing of a qualifier score to be an increase in the functional ability of a patient.

== Core sets ==
An ICF Core Set can serve as a reference framework and a practical tool to classify and describe patient functioning in a more time efficient way. ICF Core Sets can be used along the continuum of care and over the course of a health condition. The ICF classification includes more than 1,400 categories limiting its use in clinical practice. It is time-consuming for a clinician to utilize the main volume of the ICF with their patients. Only a fraction of the categories is needed. As a general rule, 20% of the codes will explain 80% of the variance observed in practice. ICF Core Sets contain as few as possible, but as many ICF categories as necessary, to describe a patient's level of functioning. It is hypothesized that using an ICF Core Set will increase the inter-rater reliability when coding clinical cases as only the relevant categories for a particular patient will be utilized. Since all of the relevant categories are listed in an ICF Core Set, its use in multidisciplinary assessments protects health professionals from missing important aspects of functioning.

== Pediatric use ==
As clinicians and researchers used the ICF, they became more aware of its limitations. The ICF lacks the ability to classify the functional characteristics of a developing child. Different ICF codes are needed across the first years of a child's life to capture the growth and development of a disability even when the child's diagnosis does not change. The coding system can provide essential information about the severity of a health condition in terms of its impact on functioning. This can serve a significant role for providers caring for children with spectrum disorders such as autism or cerebral palsy. Children with these conditions may have the same diagnoses, but their abilities and levels of functioning widely vary across and within individuals over time.

The first draft of the International Classification of Functioning, Disability and Health for Children and Youths (ICF-CY) was completed in year 2003 and published in 2007. The ICF-CY was developed to be structurally consistent with the ICF for adults. A major difference between the ICF-CY and ICF is that the generic qualifiers from the adult ICF now include developmental aspects for children and youth in the ICF-CY. Descriptions of codes in the ICF-CY were revised and expanded and new content was added to previously unused codes. Codes were added to document characteristics as adaptability, responsivity, predictability, persistence, and approachability. "Sensing" and "exploration of objects" codes were expanded as well as the "importance of learning". Since a child's main occupation is playing, it is also important to include more codes in this area. Different levels of play have separate codes in the ICF-CY (solitary, onlooker, parallel). This contrasts with the adult ICF as only one code existed in regards to leisure or recreation.

Changes in ICF-CY codes over time reflect developmental effects attributable to the child's interaction with the environment. Environmental factors influence functioning and development and can be documented as barriers or facilitators using the ICF-CY. The key environments of children and adolescents include their homes, day care centers, schools and recreation settings of playground, parks, and ball fields. Children will transition between different environments many times as they grow. For example, a child will transition into elementary or high school or from one service setting or agency to another. Attention to these transitions of children with disabilities has been identified as an important role for health care providers. A transition requires preparation and planning to find an appropriate and accommodating setting for a child's needs. With a coding system such as the ICF-CY, the transition will be smoother and interventions can start where the previous health provider left off.

== See also ==
- Social model of disability
