= Farwaniya Hospital =

Farwaniya Hospital (Arabic: مستشفى الفروانية) (also known as Al-Farwaniya Hospital) is the main public hospital in Al Farwaniyah Governorate, Kuwait. It provides general and specialist services and serves as a principal public healthcare facility for the governorate. The hospital operates from a complex comprising inpatient facilities, outpatient clinics, dental care facilities, and associated service buildings.

== History ==
The Farwaniya public hospital was originally opened in 1980. The hospital underwent a series of expansions before the development of a new complex which opened in 2022.

In April 2010, the Ministry of Health (MOH) announced the planned opening of a renal dialysis centre containing 55 dialysis units.

Health Minister Ali Al-Obaidi inaugurated a new outpatient building at the hospital, containing more than 100 specialist clinics across three floors, including internal medicine, diabetic podiatry, cardiology, orthopaedics, and ophthalmology in June 2012.

In July 2013, Health Minister Mohammed Al-Haifi inaugurated the first phase of a further expansion project, including improvements to the emergency and gastroenterology departments and patient waiting areas. At the time, the MOH was also planning a new hospital facility with a proposed capacity of 955 beds.

In February 2014, Saved Hamid Behbehani & Sons submitted the lowest bid for the construction of a 955-bed extension to Farwaniya Hospital, valued at KD 256 million. The proposed development included 30 emergency rooms, 27 operating theatres, a pharmacy, laboratories, and parking facilities for approximately 1500 vehicles. By December 2016, approximately 17 percent of the new hospital project had been completed. At the time, the project was projected to be completed by the end of 2019.

On 24 August 2022, a new public hospital complex in the Farwaniya area was inaugurated under the name New Farwaniya Hospital as part of the expansion of Kuwait’s healthcare infrastructure. The first phase of operations was inaugurated by Kuwait's Minister of Health, Dr. Khaled Al‑Saeed, with services being introduced gradually. The second phase of operations commenced on 29 September 2022, with the continued transfer of patients from the original hospital and the opening of an internal medicine ward.

In January 2023, the MOH announced that the third operational phase was scheduled to commence on 5 February 2023, incorporating obestetrics and gyaneacology and associated medical services. In October 2023, hospital director Ali Al-Mutairi announced the fourth operation phase, involving the transfer of hospital administration and preparations to relocate emergency services to the new complex. The following day, the new emergency department was inaugurated, with 84 beds, 71 clinics, and a reported capacity to accommodate 1800 patients daily.

The hospital occupies a built‑up area of approximately 423,000 square metres and comprises five main buildings, including inpatient facilities, outpatient clinics, dental care facilities and support services, as well as a multi‑storey car park.
