= Canadian Classification of Health Interventions =

Canadian procedure code system

The Canadian Classification of Health Interventions (CCI) is a system of procedure codes used in Canada developed and maintained by the Canadian Institute for Health Information.

The codes contain letters and numbers and long and short name is provided. For example, CCI code '5MD53JE' has short name 'Deliv by forceps rotation w episiotomy' and long name'Forceps traction and rotation, with episiotomy forceps rotation only with manually assisted delivery (e.g. DeLee key-in-lock, Maughan maneuver)'.

2018 CIC version contains more than 17 thousand procedural codes defined.
