= Diagnosis code =

Tool to group and identify diseases

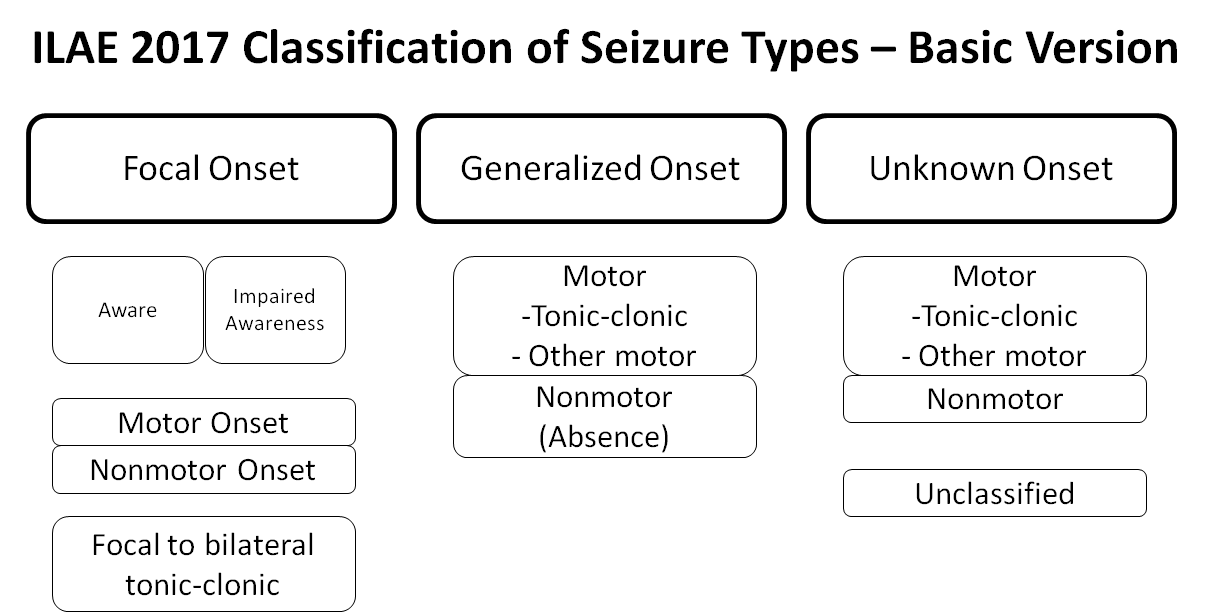
Diagnosis code for seizure types.

In health care, diagnosis codes are used as a tool to group and identify diseases, disorders, symptoms, poisonings, adverse effects of drugs and chemicals, injuries and other reasons for patient encounters. Diagnostic coding is the translation of written descriptions of diseases, illnesses and injuries into codes from a particular classification. In medical classification, diagnosis codes are used as part of the clinical coding process alongside intervention codes. Both diagnosis and intervention codes are assigned by a health professional trained in medical classification such as a clinical coder or Health Information Manager.

Several diagnosis classification systems have been implemented to various degrees of success across the world. The various classifications have a focus towards a particular patient encounter type such as emergency, inpatient, outpatient, mental health as well as surgical care. The International Statistical Classification of Diseases and Related Health Problems (ICD) is one of the most widely used classification systems for diagnosis coding as it allows comparability and use of mortality and morbidity data.

As the knowledge of health and medical advances arise, the diagnostic codes are generally revised and updated to match the most up to date current body of knowledge in the field of health. The codes may be quite frequently revised as new knowledge is attained. DSM (see below) changes some of its coding to correspond to the codes in ICD. In 2005, for example, DSM changed the diagnostic codes for circadian rhythm sleep disorders from the 307-group to the 327-group; the new codes reflect the moving of these disorders from the Mental Disorders section to the Neurological section in the ICD

== Diagnostic coding systems ==
A number of diagnostic coding systems are implemented across the world to code the stay of patients within a typical health setting, such as a hospital. The following table provides a basic list of the coding systems in use as of approximately 2010:

Classification System	Detail
ICD-9-CM	Volumes 1 and 2 only. Volume 3 contains Procedure codes
ICD-10	The international standard since about 1998
ICPC-2	Also includes reasons for encounter (RFE), procedure codes and process of care
International Classification of Sleep Disorders	
NANDA	
Diagnostic and Statistical Manual of Mental Disorders	Primarily psychiatric disorders
Online Mendelian Inheritance in Man	Genetic diseases
Read code	Used throughout United Kingdom General Practice computerised records
Systematized Nomenclature of Medicine (SNOMED)	D Axis

== Financial aspects of diagnostic coding ==
Diagnosis codes are generally used as a representation of admitted episodes in health care settings. The principal diagnosis, additional diagnoses alongside intervention codes essentially depict a patient's admission to a hospital.

Diagnoses codes are subjected to ethical considerations as they contribute to the total coded medical record in health services areas such as a hospital. Hospitals that are based on Activity Based Funding and Diagnoses-Related Group Classification systems are often subjected to high end decision making that could affect the outcome of funding. It's important to look at the scope of diagnoses codes in terms of their application in finance. The diagnoses codes in particular the Principal Diagnoses and Additional Diagnoses can significantly affect the total funding that a hospital may receive for any patient admitted.

Ethically, this highlights the fact that the assignment of the diagnoses code can be influenced by a decision to maximize reimbursement of funding. For example, when looking at the activity based funding model used in the public hospital system in Victoria the total coded medical record is responsible for its reflected funding. These decisions also affect clinical documentation by physicians as recommendations from a Health Information Service can directly affect how a clinician may document a condition that a patient may have. The difference between the codes assigned for confusion and delirium can alter a hospitals DRG assignment as delirium is considered a higher level code than confusion within the ICD-10 coding hierarchy in terms of severity. A clinical coder or Health Information Manager may feel obliged to maximize funding above the ethical requirement to be honest within their diagnostic coding; this highlights the ethical standpoint of diagnoses codes as they should be reflective of a patient's admission.

== Factors affecting accuracy in diagnostic coding ==
Accuracy is a major component in diagnoses codes. The accurate assignment of diagnoses codes in clinical coding is essential in order to effectively depict a patient's stay within a typical health service area. A number of factors can contribute to the overall accuracy coding which includes medical record legibility, physician documentation, clinical coder experience, financial decision making, miscoding, as well as classification system limitations.

Medical record legibility

The legibility of a medical record is a contributing factor in the accuracy of diagnostic coding. The assigned proxy that is extracting information from the medical record is dependent on the quality of the medical record. Factors that contribute to a medical records quality are physician documentation, handwriting legibility, compilation of forms, duplication and inaccurate patient data. For example, if a clinical coder or Health Information Manager was extracting data from a medical record in which the principal diagnoses was unclear due to illegible handwriting, the health professional would have to contact the physician responsible for documenting the diagnoses in order to correctly assign the code. In Australia, the legibility of records has been sufficiently maintained due to the implementation of highly detailed standards and guidelines which aim to improve the legibility of medical records. In particular the paper medical record standard 'AS 2828' created by Standards Australia focuses on a few key areas that are critical to maintaining a legible paper medical record.

The following criteria should be used as a guideline when creating a medical record specific to the aid of providing clear documentation for diagnostic coding. In particular the legibility of a medical record is dependent on —

1. Durability: If a medical record wasn't durable, overtime if a coder was to revisit the record and it wasn't legible it wouldn't be feasible to code from that record.
2. Ready Identification: A coder must be able to identify the exact record being coded in order to effectively extract diagnoses codes.
3. Reproducible: A coder would need to make sure that the record is reproducible in that copies can be made to aid in effective coding.

Clinical coder experience

The experience of the health professional coding a medical record is an essential variable that must be accounted for when analysing the accuracy of coding. Generally a coder with years of experience is able to extract all the relevant information from a medical record whether it is paper, scanned or semi-electronic. The diagnoses codes selected from the extraction are generally compiled and sequenced in order to represent the admission. An experienced coder may incorrectly assign codes due a lack of application of a classification systems relevant standards. An example to highlight clinical coding experience would be the standard within the Australian Coding Standards 0010 General Abstraction Guidelines. These guidelines indicate that a coder must seek further detail within a record in order to correctly assign the correct diagnoses code. An inexperienced coder may simply just use the description from the discharge summary such as Infarction and may not use the correct detail which could be further found within the details of the medical record. This directly relates to the accuracy of diagnoses codes as the experience of the health professional coder is significant in its accuracy and contribution to finance.

== Weaknesses in diagnostic coding ==
Generally, coding is a concept of modeling reality with reduced effort, but with physical copying.

- Hence, the result of coding is a reduction to the scope of representation as far as possible to be depicted with the chosen modeling technology. There will never be an escape, but choosing more than one model to serve more than one purpose. That led to various code derivatives, all of them using one basic reference code for ordering, as e.g., with ICD-10 coding. However, concurrent depiction of several models in one image remains principally impossible.
- Focusing a code on one purpose lets other purposes unsatisfied. This has to be taken into account when advertising for any coding concept. The operability of coding is generally bound to purpose. Inter-referring must be subject of evolutionary development, as code structures are subject of frequent change.
- Unambiguous coding requires strict restriction to hierarchical tree structures possibly enhanced with multiple links, but no parallel branching for contemporary coding whilst maintaining bijectivity.
- Spatial depictions of n-dimensional code spaces as coding scheme trees on flat screens may enhance imagination, but still leave the dimensionality of image limited to intelligibility of sketching, mostly as a 3D object on a 2D screen. Pivoting such image does not solve the intelligibility problem.
- Projections of code spaces as flattened graphs may ease the depiction of a code, but generally reduce the contained information with the flattening. There is no explanation given with many of the codes for transforming from one code system to another. That leads to specialized usage and to limitations in communication between codes. The escape is with code reference structures (as e.g., not existing with SNOMED3).
- Hierarchical ordering of more than one code system may be seen as appropriate, as the human body is principally invariant to coding. But the dependency implied with such hierarchies decrease the cross referencing between the code levels down to unintelligibility. The escape is with hyper maps that exceed planar views (as e.g. with SNOMED3) and their referring to other codes (as e.g., yet not existing with SNOMED3).
- Purpose of documenting will be seen as essential just for the validation of a code system in aspects of correctness. However this purpose is timely subordinate to the generating of the respective information. Hence some code system shall support the process of medical diagnosis and of medical treatment of any kind. Escape is with a specialised coding for the processes of working on diagnosis as on working with treatment (as e.g., not intended with SNOMED3).
- Intelligibility of results of coding is achieved by semantic design principles and with ontologies to support navigating in the codes. One major aspect despite the fuzziness of language is the bijectivity of coding. Escape is with explaining the code structure to avoid misinterpreting and various codes for the very same condition (as e.g., yet not served at all with SNOMED3).

== See also ==
- Systematized Nomenclature of Medicine
- Diagnosis-related group
- Medical classification
- Major Diagnostic Category
- MedDRA
- American Health Information Management Association
