= NOMESCO =

NOMESCO (Nordic Medico-Statistical Committee) is a statistical committee under the Nordic Council of Ministers. NOMESCO was set up in 1966, following a recommendation by the Nordic Council. In 1979, the Committee was made a permanent statistical committee with separate funding from the Nordic Committee on Social Policy. Today, the Committee has a permanent secretariat in Copenhagen.

The aim of NOMESCO is as follows: 1. To be responsible for the co-ordination of the health statistics in the Nordic countries, 2. To initiate new projects, partly to improve comparisons of statistics, and partly to ensure the most rational use of Nordic expert knowledge in the field, 3. To inform about Nordic statistical activities, mainly by publishing annual statistics as well as the results of special projects, surveys, etc., 4. To co-ordinate and take part in international statistical collaboration, including activities in the Baltic countries.

== NOMESCO procedures ==
Each procedure is assigned a code. For example, code JN3AE represents abdominal ultrasound examination. Codes are organized into a hierarchy. There are 4 levels (0, 1, 2, and 3) defined.
