= VeNom Coding Group =

The VeNom Coding Group is a group of veterinary academics and practitioners from across Britain who have devised a standardized terminology for use in veterinary medicine. These codes are available to academic or research institutes, software manufacturers or veterinary practices after a request for a permission.

== VeNom Codes membership ==
The VeNom Codes have been developed in the first opinion and referral hospitals at the RVC in collaboration with Glasgow Vet School and the PDSA and are now maintained by a multi-institution group of veterinary clinicians and IT specialists from the RVC, Glasgow Vet School and the PDSA called the VeNom Coding Group.

A small group of members from various institutes manage and maintain the list of terms, and invite or authorize others to use the term. A second group of members provide the scientific input to ensure the list is peer reviewed and correct - these members can be any one who uses the list. Any disputes over the list will be solved by a general consensus and overseen by the management group.

== VeNom Codes ==
The VeNom codes comprise an extensive, standardised list of terms for recording the best available diagnosis at the end of an animal visit. It comprises mainly diagnoses but also includes terms appropriate for administrative transactions (e.g. non prescription diet sales, over the counter items, travel related items) and preventive health visits (vaccination(s), routine parasite control, neutering). In the event that the clinician seeing the animal feels unable to record a diagnosis for the visit (for example, on a first consultation when only limited diagnostic workup has been possible, e.g. coughing where a precise diagnosis is not yet available) it is also possible to select one or more presenting complaints (again, these are standardised in the list). If an item is missing from the list, please advise us and we will make the necessary adjustments if required. We are currently working on other lists (procedures etc.) and these will be added to the VeNom codes in due course.

The VeNom codes are a long list of conditions (Term name) identified by their unique numeric codes (Data Dictionary Id). There is a label field to identify the type of term (Container and Container ID–e.g. diagnosis, presenting complaint, administrative task etc.). The Top level modelling field includes the parent grouping / body system for each term. There is also a CRIS Active flag which is elected if the PMS prefers the referral centre version. In this version presenting complaints are stated without 'presenting complaint - ' prefix and the administrative tasks are excluded. For the first opinion version the Rx Active flag field allows selection of this version and includes presenting complaints with the prefix ‘presenting complaint -’ to highlight this is not strictly a diagnosis. The final field is the Active Flag key which indicates if the term is active or has been inactivated.

The VeNom Codes have been developed in the first opinion and referral hospitals at the Royal Veterinary College (RVC) in collaboration with Glasgow Vet School and the PDSA and the codes are now maintained by a multi-institution group of veterinary clinicians and IT experts from the RVC, Glasgow Vet School and the PDSA called the VeNom Coding Group. The codes are a long list identified by their unique numeric code and work best with a multi-letter search function–so clinicians type ‘abs’ and get all possible terms with abs as first letters of any of the words in the diagnosis–e.g. ‘anal sac abscess’, ‘abscess–neck (cervical)’,...etc. For some terms there are synonyms in brackets behind the main term to allow identification of the correct term if these letters are typed in the search box.

The main concern for VeNom Codes is that all PMS's and other end-users that adopt the VeNom codes also adopt the rules of the VeNom Coding group–namely that the VeNom Coding group maintains the list. If, for example, a practitioner requests a new item, then you forward the request to us (or they go direct to us). We then put it to the VeNom Coding group to vote on and if approved it is added to the list, if not it doesn't go on the list. Our turn around on new items is 3-5 working days currently. The new item would be added to the list and then emailed out to each computer management system that uses the codes to upload to their system and practices. We are now working to 3 monthly updates, though can issue additional updates if end-users require specific terms to be added sooner. We also request that the diagnostic lists used by the PMS's and other end-users are kept restricted to the standard VeNom terms and that practitioners can not their own terms as they go along.

== The Data Dictionary ==
The codes are a long list identified by their unique numeric codes (Data dictionary id) and work well with a multi-letter search function–so clinicians type ‘abs’ and get all possible terms with abs as first letters of any of the words in the diagnosis–e.g. ‘anal sac abscess’, ‘abscess–neck (cervical)’,...etc. For some terms there are synonyms in brackets behind the main term to allow identification of the correct term if these letters are typed in the search box. Apart from the Term name and data dictionary id (numeric code), there is a label field to identify the type of term and then currently the other fields of the codes include a 'CRIS active flag' which is elected if you want the referral version–presenting complaints without 'presenting complaint' prefix and without the admin tasks etc. Otherwise for the first opinion version the ‘Rx Active flag’ field allows selection of this version. The final field is the Active flag which indicates if the term is active or has been inactivated.
