= Pharmaceutical code =

Drug identifier

Pharmaceutical codes are used in medical classification to uniquely identify medication. They may uniquely identify an active ingredient, drug system (including inactive ingredients and time-release agents) in general, or a specific pharmaceutical product from a specific manufacturer.

== Examples ==
Drug system identifiers (manufacturer-specific including inactive ingredients):

- National Drug Code (NDC) — administered by Food and Drug Administration.
- Drug Identification Number (DIN) — administered by Health Canada under the Food and Drugs Act
- Hong Kong Drug Registration — administered by the Pharmaceutical Service of the Department of Health (Hong Kong)
- National Pharmaceutical Product Index - South Africa

Hierarchical systems:

- Anatomical Therapeutic Chemical Classification System (AT, or ATC/DDD) — administered by World Health Organization
- Generic Product Identifier (GPI) — hierarchical classification number published by MediSpan
- SNOMED — C axis

Ingredients:

- Unique Ingredient Identifier

Proprietary database identifiers include those assigned by First Databank, Micromedex, MediSpan, Gold Standard Drug Database (published by Elsevier), and Cerner Multum MediSource Lexicon; these are cross-indexed by RxNorm, which also assigns a unique identifier (RxCUI) to every combination of active ingredient and dose level.

== See also ==
- Drug nomenclature
- Drug class
