= ICD-10 Procedure Coding System =

Medical classification system used for procedural coding

The ICD-10 Procedure Coding System (ICD-10-PCS) is a US system of medical classification used for procedural coding. The Centers for Medicare and Medicaid Services, the agency responsible for maintaining the inpatient procedure code set in the U.S., contracted with 3M Health Information Systems in 1995 to design and then develop a procedure classification system to replace Volume 3 of ICD-9-CM. ICD-9-CM contains a procedure classification; ICD-10-CM does not. ICD-10-PCS is the result. ICD-10-PCS was initially released in 1998. It has been updated annually since that time. Despite being named after the WHO's International Classification of Diseases, it is a US-developed standard which is not used outside the United States.

== Section structure ==
Each code consists of seven alphanumeric characters. The first character is the 'section'. The second through seventh characters mean different things in each section. Each character can be any of 34 possible values the ten digits 0-9 and the 24 letters A-H, J-N and P-Z may be used in each character. The letters O and I are excluded to avoid confusion with the numbers 0 and 1. There are no decimals in ICD-10-PCS

Of the 72,081 codes in ICD-10-PCS, 62,022 are in the first section, "Medical and surgical".

Character 1	Character 2	Character 3	Character 4	Character 5	Character 6	Character 7
0 Medical and Surgical	Body System; 0 Central nervous system; 1 Peripheral nervous system; 2 Heart and Great vessels; 3 Upper arteries; 4 Lower arteries; 5 Upper veins; 6 Lower veins; 7 Lymphatic and Hemic system; 8 Eye; 9 Ear, Nose, Sinus; B Respiratory System; C Mouth and Throat; D Gastrointestinal system; F Hepatobiliary System and Pancreas; G Endocrine system; H Skin and Breast; J Subcutaneous tissue; K Muscles; L Tendons; M Bursae and Ligaments; N Head and Facial bones; P Upper bones; Q Lower bones; R Upper joints; S Lower joints; T Urinary system; U Female reproductive system; V Male reproductive system; W Anatomical regions, General; X Anatomical regions, Upper extremities; Y Anatomical regions, Lower extremities	Root Operation see below	Body Part	Approach; 0 Open; 3 Percutaneous; 4 Percutaneous Endoscopic; 7 Via Natural or Artificial Opening; 8 Via Natural or Artificial Opening Endoscopic; F Via Natural or Artificial Opening Endoscopic with Percutaneous Endoscopic Assistance; X External	Device	Qualifier
1 Obstetrics	10 Pregnancy	102 Change; 109 Drainage; 10A Abortion; 10D Extraction; 10E Delivery; 10H Insertion; 10J Inspection; 10P Removal; 10Q Repair; 10S Reposition; 10T Resection; 10Y Transplantation	Body Part	Approach	Device	Qualifier
2 Placement	2W Anatomical Regions; 2Y Anatomical Orifices	Root Operation; 2?0 Change; 2?1 Compression; 2?2 Dressing; 2?3 Immobilization; 2?4 Packing; 2?5 Removal; 2?6 Traction	Body Region/Orifice	Approach	Device	Qualifier
3 Administration	30 Circulatory; 3CIndwelling Device; 3E Physiological Systems and Anatomical Regions	Root Operation	Body System/Region	Approach	Substance	Qualifier
4 Measurement and Monitoring	4A Physiological Systems; 4B Physiological Devices	Root Operation	Body System	Approach	Function	Qualifier
5 Extracorporeal Assistance and Performance	5A Physiological Systems	Root Operation	Body System	Duration	Function	Qualifier
6 Extracorporeal Therapies	6A Physiological Systems	Root Operation; 6A0 Atmospheric control; 6A1 Decompression; 6A2 Electromagnetic therapy; 6A3 Hyperthermia; 6A4 Hypothermia; 6A5 Pheresis; 6A6 Phototherapy; 6A7 Ultrasound therapy; 6A8 Ultraviolet light therapy; 6A9 Shock wave therapy	Body System	Duration	Qualifier	Qualifier
7 Osteopathic	7W	7W0	Body Region	Approach	Method	Qualifier
8 Other Procedures	8C Indwelling Device; 8E Physiological Systems and Anatomical Regions	Root Operation	Body Region	Approach	Method	Qualifier
9 Chiropractic	9W	9WB	Body Region	Approach	Method	Qualifier
B Imaging	Body System; 0 Central Nervous System; 2 Heart; 3 Upper Arteries; 4 Lower Arteries; 5 Veins; 7 Lymphatic System; 8 Eye; 9 Ear, Nose, Mouth and Throat; B Respiratory System; D Gastrointestinal System; F Hepatobiliary System and Pancreas; G Endocrine System; H Skin, Subcutaneous Tissue and Breast; L Connective Tissue; N Skull and Facial Bones; P Non-Axial Upper Bones; Q Non-Axial Lower Bones; R Axial Skeleton, Except Skull and Facial Bones; T Urinary System; U Female Reproductive System; V Male Reproductive System; W Anatomical Regions; Y Fetus and Obstetrical	Root Type	Body Part	Contrast; 0=high osmolar contrast; 1=low osmolar contrast; z=other contrast	Qualifier	Qualifier
C Nuclear medicine	Body System; 0 Central Nervous System; 2 Heart; 5 Veins; 7 Lymphatic and Hematologic System; 8 Eye; 9 Ear, Nose, Mouth and Throat; B Respiratory System; D Gastrointestinal System; F Hepatobiliary System and Pancreas; G Endocrine System; H Skin, Subcutaneous Tissue and Breast; P Musculoskeletal System; T Urinary System; V Male Reproductive System; W Anatomical Regions	Root Type	Body Part	Radionuclide	Qualifier	Qualifier
D Radiation oncology	Body System; 0 Central and Peripheral Nervous System; 7 Lymphatic and Hematologic System; 8 Eye; 9 Ear, Nose, Mouth and Throat; B Respiratory System; D Gastrointestinal System; F Hepatobiliary System and Pancreas; G Endocrine System; H Skin; M Breast; P Musculoskeletal System; T Urinary System; U Female Reproductive System; V Male Reproductive System; W Anatomical Regions	Root Type	Body Part	Modality Qualifier	Isotope	Qualifier
F Physical rehabilitation and Diagnostic Audiology	F/0 Rehabilitation; F/1 Diagnostic Audiology	Root Type	Body System & Region	Type Qualifier	Equipment	Qualifier
G Mental health	GZ None	Root Type; GZ1 Psychological tests; GZ2 Crisis intervention; GZ3 Medication management; GZ5 Individual psychotherapy; GZ6 Counseling; GZ7 Family psychotherapy; GZB Electroconvulsive therapy; GZC Biofeedback; GZF Hypnosis; GZG Narcosynthesis; GZH Group psychotherapy; GZJ Light therapy	Type Qualifier	Qualifier	Qualifier	Qualifier
H Substance abuse Treatment	HZ None	Root Type	Type Qualifier	Qualifier	Qualifier	Qualifier
X New Technology						

=== Root operations ===
For medical/surgical, these are the root operation codes:

00 alteration; 01 bypass; 02 change; 03 control; 04 creation; 05 destruction; 06 detachment; 07 dilation; 08 division; 09 drainage; 0B excision; 0C extirpation; 0D extraction; 0F fragmentation; 0G fusion; 0H insertion; 0J inspection; 0K map; 0L occlusion; 0M reattachment; 0N release; 0P removal; 0Q repair; 0R replacement; 0S reposition; 0T resection; 0U supplement; 0V restriction; 0W revision; 0X transfer; 0Y transplantation

They can be grouped into several categories:

- take out or eliminate all or a portion of a body part: excision (sigmoid polypectomy), resection (total nephrectomy), extraction (toenail extraction), destruction (rectal polyp fulguration), detachment (below knee amputation). For biopsies, "extraction" is used when force is required (as with endometrial biopsy), and "excision" is used when minimal force is involved (as with liver biopsy). See also ectomy.
- involve putting in or on, putting back, or moving living body part: transplantation (heart transplant), reattachment (finger reattachment), reposition (reposition undescended testicle), transfer (tendon transfer)
- take out or eliminate solid matter, fluids, or gases from a body part: drainage (incision and drainage), extirpation (thrombectomy), fragmentation (lithotripsy of gallstones)
- only involve examination of body parts and regions: inspection (diagnostic arthroscopy), map (cardiac mapping)
- involve putting in or on, putting back, or moving living body part: bypass (gastrojejunal bypass), dilation (coronary artery dilation), occlusion (fallopian tube ligation), restriction (cervical cerclage)
- always involve devices: insertion (pacemaker insertion), replacement (total hip replacement), supplement (herniorrhaphy using mesh), removal (cardiac pacemaker removal), change (drainage tube change), revision (hip prosthesis adjustment)
- involve cutting and separation only: division (osteotomy), release (peritoneal adhesiolysis)
- involving other repair: control (control of postprostatectomy bleeding), repair (suture of laceration)
- with other objectives: alteration (face lift), creation (artificial vagina creation), fusion (spinal fusion)

=== Regions ===
Region	Code
Head	0
Cervical	1
Thoracic	2
Lumbar	3
Sacrum	4
Pelvis	5
Lower extremities	6
Upper extremities	7
Rib cage	8
Abdomen	9

== See also ==
- ICD-10 Clinical Modification
