= International Classification of Diseases =

International standard diagnostic tool

ICD code version used to classify causes of death

The International Classification of Diseases (ICD) is the globally authoritative medical classification and terminology used in epidemiology, health management, clinical diagnosis, and health information management, resource allocation, clinican recording, decision support and health financing. It exists currently in its eleventh revision ICD-11 and it is notably different in detail and technology from all previous revisions of ICD. The ICD is maintained by the World Health Organization (WHO), which is the directing and coordinating authority for health within the United Nations System. The ICD provides a standardized framework for recording causes of illness and death, interoperability, comparing health data across countries and time periods, supporting reimbursement and resource allocation, and feeding automated decision support in clinical and public health settings. It maps health conditions to corresponding generic categories together with specific variations, each assigned a designated code. Its consistent application underpins international comparability in the collection, processing, and analysis of health statistics — a foundation for evidence-based health policy at both national and global levels.

The ICD is published by the WHO and used worldwide for morbidity and mortality recording and statistics, reimbursement systems, and automated decision support in health care. The ICD is a core system for healthcare-related issues of the WHO Family of International Classifications (WHO-FIC).

The ICD-11, as it is known, was adopted by WHO's World Health Assembly (WHA) on 28 May 2019 and officially came into effect on 1 January 2022. Unlike previous revisions — which were updated editions of a paper-based classification — ICD-11 represents a fundamental architectural redesign built from the outset for the digital age, introducing a common ontological foundation, postcoordination of clinical concepts, advanced interoperability with modern health information systems, and an annually updated API-accessible coding tool.

On 11 February 2022, the WHO stated that 35 countries were using the ICD-11. On 14 February 2023, the WHO reported that 64 countries were "in different stages of ICD-11 implementation". In May 2024, they stated that 50 countries were either conducting or expanding implementation pilots, and that 14 countries were actively using the ICD-11. As of July 2025, 132 WHO member states were at various stages of ICD-11 implementation.

The ICD is part of a "family" of international classifications (WHOFIC) that complement each other, including the following classifications:

- the International Classification of Functioning, Disability and Health (ICF) that focuses on the domains of functioning (disability) associated with health conditions, from both medical and social perspectives, and
- the International Classification of Health Interventions (ICHI) that classifies the whole range of medical, nursing, functioning and public health interventions.

The title of the ICD is formally the International Statistical Classification of Diseases and Related Health Problems; the original title, the International Classification of Diseases, is still the informal name by which the ICD is usually known.

In the United States and some other countries, the Diagnostic and Statistical Manual of Mental Disorders (DSM) is preferred when classifying mental disorders for certain purposes.

The ICD is currently the most widely used statistical classification system for diseases in the world. In addition, some countries—including Australia, Canada, and the United States—have developed their own adaptations of ICD, with more procedure codes for classification of operative or diagnostic procedures.

== Early history ==
In 1860, during the international statistical congress held in London, Florence Nightingale made a proposal that was to result in the development of the first model of systematic collection of hospital data. In 1893, a French physician, Jacques Bertillon, introduced the Bertillon Classification of Causes of Death at a congress of the International Statistical Institute (ISI) in Chicago.

A number of countries adopted Bertillon's system, which was based on the principle of distinguishing between general diseases and those localized to a particular organ or anatomical site, as used by the City of Paris for classifying deaths. Subsequent revisions represented a synthesis of English, German, and Swiss classifications, expanding from the original 44 titles to 161 titles.

In 1898, the American Public Health Association (APHA) recommended that the registrars of Canada, Mexico, and the United States also adopt it. The APHA also recommended revising the system every 10 years to ensure the system remained current with medical practice advances. As a result, the first international conference to revise the International Classification of Causes of Death (ICD) took place in 1900, with revisions occurring every ten years thereafter. At that time, the classification system was contained in one book, which included an Alphabetic Index as well as a Tabular List. The book was small compared with current coding texts.

The revisions that followed contained minor changes. Responsibility for ICD revisions fell to the Mixed Commission, a group composed of representatives from the ISI and the Health Organization of the League of Nations.

== Versions ==
=== ICD-6 ===
In 1948, the WHO assumed responsibility for preparing and publishing the revisions to the ICD every ten years. (It later became clear that the established ten year interval between revisions was too short.)

The ICD-6, published in 1949, was the first to be shaped to become suitable for morbidity reporting. Accordingly, the name changed from "International List of Causes of Death" to the "International Statistical Classification of Diseases, Injuries and Causes of Death" (ICD). The combined code section for injuries and their associated accidents was split into two, a chapter for injuries, and a chapter for their external causes. With use for morbidity there was a need for coding mental conditions, and for the first time a section on mental disorders was added.

=== ICD-7 ===
The International Conference for the Seventh Revision of the International Classification of Diseases was held in Paris under the auspices of WHO in February 1955. In accordance with a recommendation of the WHO Expert Committee on Health Statistics, this revision was limited to essential changes and amendments of errors and inconsistencies.

=== ICD-8 ===
The 8th Revision Conference convened by WHO met in Geneva, from 6 to 12 July 1965. This revision was more radical than the Seventh but left unchanged the basic structure of the Classification and the general philosophy of classifying diseases, whenever possible, according to their etiology rather than a particular manifestation. During the years that the Seventh and Eighth Revisions of the ICD were in force, the use of the ICD for indexing hospital medical records increased rapidly and some countries prepared national adaptations which provided the additional detail needed for this application of the ICD.

==== ICDA-8 (United States) ====
In the US, a group of consultants was asked to study the ICD-8 for its applicability to various users in the United States. This group recommended that further detail be provided for coding hospital and morbidity data. The American Hospital Association's "Advisory Committee to the Central Office on ICDA" developed the needed adaptation proposals, resulting in the publication of the International Classification of Diseases, Adapted (ICDA). In 1968, the United States Public Health Service published the International Classification of Diseases, Adapted, 8th Revision for use in the United States (ICDA-8). Beginning in 1968, ICDA-8 served as the basis for coding diagnostic data for both official morbidity and mortality statistics in the United States.

=== ICD-9 ===
The International Conference for the Ninth Revision of the International Statistical Classification of Diseases, Injuries, and Causes of Death, convened by WHO, met in Geneva from 30 September to 6 October 1975. In the discussions leading up to the conference, it had originally been intended that there should be little change other than updating of the classification. This was mainly because of the expense of adapting data processing systems each time the classification was revised.

There had been an enormous growth of interest in the ICD and ways had to be found of responding to this, partly by modifying the classification itself and partly by introducing special coding provisions. A number of representations were made by specialist bodies which had become interested in using the ICD for their own statistics. Some subject areas in the classification were regarded as inappropriately arranged and there was considerable pressure for more detail and for adaptation of the classification to make it more relevant for the evaluation of medical care, by classifying conditions to the chapters concerned with the part of the body affected rather than to those dealing with the underlying generalized disease.

At the other end of the scale, there were representations from countries and areas where a detailed and sophisticated classification was irrelevant, but which nevertheless needed a classification based on the ICD in order to assess their progress in health care and in the control of disease. A field test with a bi-axial classification approach—one axis (criterion) for anatomy, with another for etiology—showed the impracticability of such approach for routine use.

The final proposals presented to and accepted by the Conference in 1978 retained the basic structure of the ICD, although with much additional detail at the level of the four digit subcategories, and some optional five digit subdivisions. For the benefit of users not requiring such detail, care was taken to ensure that the categories at the three digit level were appropriate.

As the World Health Organization explains: "For the benefit of users wishing to produce statistics and indexes oriented towards medical care, the 9th Revision included an optional alternative method of classifying diagnostic statements, including information about both an underlying general disease and a manifestation in a particular organ or site. This system became known as the 'dagger and asterisk system' and is retained in the Tenth Revision. A number of other technical innovations were included in the Ninth Revision, aimed at increasing its flexibility for use in a variety of situations."

It was eventually replaced by ICD-10, the version currently in use by the WHO and most countries. Given the widespread expansion in the tenth revision, it is not possible to convert ICD-9 data sets directly into ICD-10 data sets, although some tools are available to help guide users. Publication of ICD-9 without IP restrictions in a world with evolving electronic data systems led to a range of products based on ICD-9, such as MeDRA or the Read directory.

==== International Classification of Procedures in Medicine (ICPM) ====
When ICD-9 was published by the World Health Organization (WHO), the International Classification of Procedures in Medicine (ICPM) was also developed (1975) and published (1978). The ICPM surgical procedures fascicle was originally created by the United States, based on its adaptations of ICD (called ICDA), which had contained a procedure classification since 1962. ICPM is published separately from the ICD disease classification as a series of supplementary documents called fascicles (bundles or groups of items). Each fascicle contains a classification of modes of laboratory, radiology, surgery, therapy, and other diagnostic procedures. Many countries have adapted and translated the ICPM in parts or as a whole and are using it with amendments since then.

==== ICD-9-CM (United States) ====
The International Classification of Diseases, Clinical Modification (ICD-9-CM) was an adaptation created by the US National Center for Health Statistics (NCHS) and used in assigning diagnostic and procedure codes associated with inpatient, outpatient, and physician office utilization in the United States. The ICD-9-CM is based on the ICD-9 but provides for additional morbidity detail. It was updated annually on October 1.

It consists three volumes:

- Volumes 1 and 2 contain diagnosis codes. (Volume 1 is a tabular listing, and volume 2 is an index.) Extended for ICD-9-CM
- Volume 3 contains procedure codes for surgical, diagnostic, and therapeutic procedures. ICD-9-CM only

The NCHS and the Centers for Medicare and Medicaid Services are the US governmental agencies responsible for overseeing all changes and modifications to the ICD-9-CM.

=== ICD-10 ===
Work on ICD-10 began in 1983, and the new revision was endorsed by the Forty-third World Health Assembly in May 1990. It came into effect in WHO Member States starting on 1 January 1993. The classification system allows more than 55,000 different codes and permits tracking of many new diagnoses and procedures, a significant expansion on the 17,000 codes available in ICD-9. Adoption was relatively swift in most of the world. Several materials are made available online by WHO to facilitate its use, including manuals for both general use (ICD-10 Volume 2) and Chapter V specifically (The ICD-10 Classification of Mental and Behavioural Disorders), training guidelines, a browser, and files for download. Some countries have adapted the international standard, such as the "ICD-10-AM" published in Australia in 1998 (also used in New Zealand), and the "ICD-10-CA" introduced in Canada in 2000.

==== ICD-10-CM (United States) ====
Adoption of ICD-10-CM was slow in the United States. Since 1979, the US had required ICD-9-CM codes for Medicare and Medicaid claims, and most of the rest of the American medical industry followed suit. On 1 January 1999 the ICD-10 (without clinical extensions) was adopted for reporting mortality, but ICD-9-CM was still used for morbidity. Meanwhile, NCHS received permission from the WHO to create a clinical modification of the ICD-10, and has production of all these systems:

- ICD-10-CM, for diagnosis codes, replaces volumes 1 and 2. Annual updates are provided.
- ICD-10-PCS, for procedure codes, replaces volume 3. Annual updates are provided.

On 21 August 2008, the US Department of Health and Human Services (HHS) proposed new code sets to be used for reporting diagnoses and procedures on health care transactions. Under the proposal, the ICD-9-CM code sets would be replaced with the ICD-10-CM code sets, effective 1 October 2013. On 17 April 2012 the Department of Health and Human Services (HHS) published a proposed rule that would delay, from 1 October 2013 to 1 October 2014, the compliance date for the ICD-10-CM and PCS. Once again, Congress delayed implementation date to 1 October 2015, after it was inserted into "Doc Fix" Bill without debate over objections of many.

Revisions to ICD-10-CM Include:

- Relevant information for ambulatory and managed care encounter.
- Expanded injury codes.
- New combination codes for diagnosis/symptoms to reduce the number of codes needed to describe a problem fully.
- Addition of sixth and seventh digit classification.
- Classification specific to laterality.
- Classification refinement for increased data granularity.

==== ICD-10-CA (Canada) ====
ICD-10-CA is a clinical modification of ICD-10 developed by the Canadian Institute for Health Information for morbidity classification in Canada. ICD-10-CA applies beyond acute hospital care, and includes conditions and situations that are not diseases but represent risk factors to health, such as occupational and environmental factors, lifestyle and psycho-social circumstances.

=== ICD-11 ===
The eleventh revision of the International Classification of Diseases, or the ICD-11, is almost five times as big as the ICD-10. It was created following a decade of development involving over 300 specialists from 55 countries. Following an alpha version in May 2011 and a beta draft in May 2012, a stable version of the ICD-11 was released on 18 June 2018, and officially endorsed by all WHO members during the 72nd World Health Assembly on 28 May 2019.

For the ICD-11, the WHO decided to differentiate between the core of the system and its derived specialty versions, such as the ICD-O for oncology. As such, the collection of all ICD entities is called the Foundation Component. From this common core, subsets can be derived. The primary derivative of the Foundation is called the ICD-11 MMS, and it is this system that is commonly referred to and recognized as "the ICD-11". MMS stands for Mortality and Morbidity Statistics.

ICD-11 comes with an implementation package that includes transition tables from and to ICD-10, a translation tool, a coding tool, web-services, the ICD-11 CDDR (a DSM-like manual for Chapter 06), training material, and more. All tools are accessible after self-registration from the Maintenance Platform.

The ICD-11 officially came into effect on 1 January 2022, although the WHO admitted that "not many countries are likely to adapt that quickly". In the United States, the advisory body of the Secretary of Health and Human Services in 2019 gave an expected release year of 2025. However by April 2024, with little progress towards ICD-11 adoption having been made, the advisory body was recommending that the Secretary urgently appoint a central office or agency to take responsibility for co-ordinating the adoption of ICD-11 in the United States. In China, the National Health Commission endorsed the transition to ICD-11 in 2018, and in 2023 a national pilot of the ICD-11 morbidity coding was carried out.

== Usage in the United States ==
In the United States, the US Public Health Service published The International Classification of Diseases, Adapted for Indexing of Hospital Records and Operation Classification (ICDA), completed in 1962 and expanding the ICD-7 in a number of areas to more completely meet the indexing needs of hospitals. The US Public Health Service later published the Eighth Revision, International Classification of Diseases, Adapted for Use in the United States, commonly referred to as ICDA-8, for official national morbidity and mortality statistics. This was followed by the ICD, 9th Revision, Clinical Modification, known as ICD-9-CM, published by the US Department of Health and Human Services and used by hospitals and other healthcare facilities to better describe the clinical picture of the patient. The diagnosis component of ICD-9-CM is completely consistent with ICD-9 codes, and remains the data standard for reporting morbidity. National adaptations of the ICD-10 progressed to incorporate both clinical code (ICD-10-CM) and procedure code (ICD-10-PCS) with the revisions completed in 2003. In 2009, the US Centers for Medicare and Medicaid Services announced that it would begin using ICD-10 on April 1, 2010, with full compliance by all involved parties by 2013. However, the US extended the deadline twice and did not formally require transitioning to ICD-10-CM (for most clinical encounters) until October 1, 2015.

The years for which causes of death in the United States have been classified by each revision as follows:

- ICD-1: 1900
- ICD-2: 1910
- ICD-3: 1921
- ICD-4: 1930
- ICD-5: 1939
- ICD-6: 1949
- ICD-7: 1958
- ICDA-8: 1968
- ICD-9-CM: 1979
- ICD-10-CM: 1999

Cause of death on United States death certificates, statistically compiled by the Centers for Disease Control and Prevention (CDC), are coded in the ICD, which does not include codes for human and system factors commonly called medical errors.

== Usage in the European Union ==
Some EU countries use the ICD to compute the maximum Abbreviated Injury Scale for traffic statistics.

== Mental health conditions ==
The various ICD editions include sections that classify mental and behavioural disorders. The ICD-10 Classification of Mental and Behavioural Disorders: Clinical Descriptions and Diagnostic Guidelines – also known as the "blue book" – is derived from Chapter V of ICD-10 and gives the diagnostic criteria for the conditions listed at each category therein. The blue book was developed separately to, but coexists with, the Diagnostic and Statistical Manual of Mental Disorders (DSM) of the American Psychiatric Association—though both seek to use the same diagnostic classifications. A survey of psychiatrists in 66 countries comparing use of the ICD-10 and DSM-IV found that the former was more often used for clinical diagnosis while the latter was more valued for research.

As part of the development of the ICD-11, WHO established an "International Advisory Group" to guide what would become the chapter on "Mental, behavioural or neurodevelopmental disorders". The working group proposed that ICD-11 should declassify the categories within ICD-10 at "F66 Psychological and behavioural disorders that are associated with sexual development and orientation". The group reported to WHO that there was "no evidence" these classifications were clinically useful, as they do not "contribute to health service delivery or treatment selection nor provide essential information for public health surveillance." Adding that; despite ICD-10 explicitly stating "sexual orientation by itself is not to be considered a disorder", the inclusion of such categories "suggest that mental disorders exist that are uniquely linked to sexual orientation and gender expression." A position already recognised by the DSM, as well as other classification systems.

The ICD is actually the official system for the US, although many mental health professionals do not realize this due to the dominance of the DSM.

A psychologist has stated: "Serious problems with the clinical utility of both the ICD and the DSM are widely acknowledged."

== See also ==
- Clinical coder
- Medical classifications
  - Classification of mental disorders
  - Classification of Pharmaco-Therapeutic Referrals
  - International Classification of Primary Care (ICPC)
  - Research Domain Criteria (RDoC), a framework being developed by the National Institute of Mental Health
- Medical diagnosis
  - Diagnosis-related group (DRG)
- Medical terminology
  - Current Procedural Terminology
  - MedDRA (Medical Dictionary for Regulatory Activities)
  - SNOMED CT
- WHO Family of International Classifications
  - International Classification of Functioning, Disability and Health
  - International Classification of Health Interventions
