= List of regulators in the United Kingdom =

The following is a list of regulators in the UK. Regulators exercise regulatory or supervisory authority over a variety of endeavours.

In addition, local authorities in the UK provide regulatory functions in a number of areas. The UK is also bound by a number of European and other trans-national regulators, not listed here.

Professional associations also act to regulate their memberships. Examples include the Institute of Chartered Accountants in England and Wales, the Chartered Institute of Legal Executives, the Chartered Institute for the Management of Sport and Physical Activity, and the Engineering Council.

== Charities ==
- Charity Commission for England and Wales
- Charity Commission for Northern Ireland
- Office of the Scottish Charity Regulator

== Education ==
=== England ===
- Ofqual – Office of Qualifications and Examinations Regulation
- Ofsted – Office for Standards in Education, Children's Services and Skills in England
- Office for Students (OfS)
- Teaching Regulation Agency

=== Northern Ireland ===
- Council for the Curriculum, Examinations and Assessment (CCEA)
- Education and Training Inspectorate
- General Teaching Council for Northern Ireland (GTCNI)

=== Scotland ===
- Education Scotland
- General Teaching Council for Scotland
- Scottish Qualifications Authority

=== Wales ===
- Education Workforce Council
- Estyn – The education and training inspectorate for Wales
- Higher Education Funding Council for Wales
- Qualifications Wales

== Environment ==
- Environment Agency (EA)
- Environmental Standards Scotland
- Marine and Fisheries Division
- Marine Directorate
- Marine Management Organisation (MMO)
- Natural Resources Wales (NRW)
- Northern Ireland Environment Agency (NIEA)
- Office for Environmental Protection (OEP)
- Scottish Environment Protection Agency (SEPA)

== Business and finance ==
- Bank of England
- Financial Conduct Authority (FCA)
  - The Office for Professional Body Anti-Money Laundering Supervision (OPBAS)
- Financial Reporting Council
- Regulator of Community Interest Companies
- Payment Systems Regulator (PSR)
- Pensions Regulator
- Prudential Regulation Authority (PRA)

== Health ==
- Complementary and Natural Healthcare Council (CNHC)
- General Chiropractic Council (GCC)
- General Dental Council (GDC)
- General Medical Council (GMC)
- General Optical Council (GOC)
- General Osteopathic Council (GOsC)
- General Pharmaceutical Council (GPhC)
- Health and Care Professions Council (HCPC) – fifteen professions with designated titles
- Health and Safety Executive (HSE)
- Health and Safety Executive for Northern Ireland (HSENI)
- Healthcare Inspectorate Wales (HIW)
- Healthcare Improvement Scotland
- Healthcare Safety Investigation Branch (HSIB)
- Human Fertilisation and Embryology Authority
- Human Tissue Authority (HTA)
- Medicines and Healthcare products Regulatory Agency (MHRA)
- Nursing and Midwifery Council (NMC)
- Pharmaceutical Society of Northern Ireland (PSNI)
- Professional Standards Authority for Health and Social Care
- Public Health Scotland
- Public Health Wales
- Regulation and Quality Improvement Authority (Northern Ireland) (RQIA)
- Royal College of Veterinary Surgeons (RCVS)
- UK Health Security Agency (UKHSA – health security in England, and some UK-wide public health roles)

== Housing ==
- Regulator of Social Housing
- Scottish Housing Regulator

== Law ==
- Authorised Conveyancing Practitioners Board
- Bar Standards Board
- Council for Licensed Conveyancers
- Costs Lawyer Standards Board
- Faculty of Advocates
- Immigration Advice Authority
- Law Society of Northern Ireland
- Law Society of Scotland
- Legal Services Oversight Commissioner for Northern Ireland
- Master of the Faculties
- Solicitors Regulation Authority

== Social care ==
- Care Quality Commission (CQC)
- Scottish Care Inspectorate
- Care Council for Wales (CCW)
- Social Work England
- Northern Ireland Social Care Council (NISCC)
- Scottish Social Services Council (SSSC)

== Transport ==
- Civil Aviation Authority (CAA)
- Maritime and Coastguard Agency (MCA)
- Office of Rail and Road (ORR)
- Rail Safety Authority – Northern Ireland

== Utilities ==
- Drinking Water Inspectorate (England and Wales)
- Drinking Water Inspectorate (Northern Ireland)
- Drinking Water Quality Regulator for Scotland
- Northern Ireland Authority for Utility Regulation (the Utility Regulator) – economic regulation of the electricity, gas, water and wastewater industries in Northern Ireland
- Ofcom – the Office of Communications, regulator and competition authority for the UK communications industries
- Office for Nuclear Regulation (ONR) – regulator for the UK nuclear industry
- Ofgem – the Office of Gas and Electricity Markets, regulation of the electricity and gas industries in Great Britain
- Ofwat – the Water Services Regulation Authority, economic regulation of the water and wastewater industries in England and Wales
- Water Industry Commission for Scotland – economic regulation of the water and wastewater industries in Scotland

== Others ==
- Accreditation Service
- Advertising Standards Authority
- British Board of Film Classification
- Building Safety Regulator
- Competition and Markets Authority
- Council for Registered Gas Installers
- Direct Marketing Authority
- Equality and Human Rights Commission
- Equality Commission for Northern Ireland (ECNI)
- Fair Work Agency
- Food Standards Agency
- Food Standards Scotland
- Forensic Science Regulator
- Fundraising Regulator
- Gambling Commission
- HM Revenue and Customs
- Impress
- Independent Football Regulator
- Independent Press Standards Organisation
- Information Commissioner's Office
- North Sea Transition Authority
- Northern Ireland Human Rights Commission (NIHRC)
- Office for Product Safety and Standards
- Planning Inspectorate
- Independent Office for Police Conduct
- Security Industry Authority

== See also ==
- List of professional associations in the United Kingdom
- Inspectorate § UK
