= Unlicensed assistive personnel =

Paraprofessionals who assist with bedside care

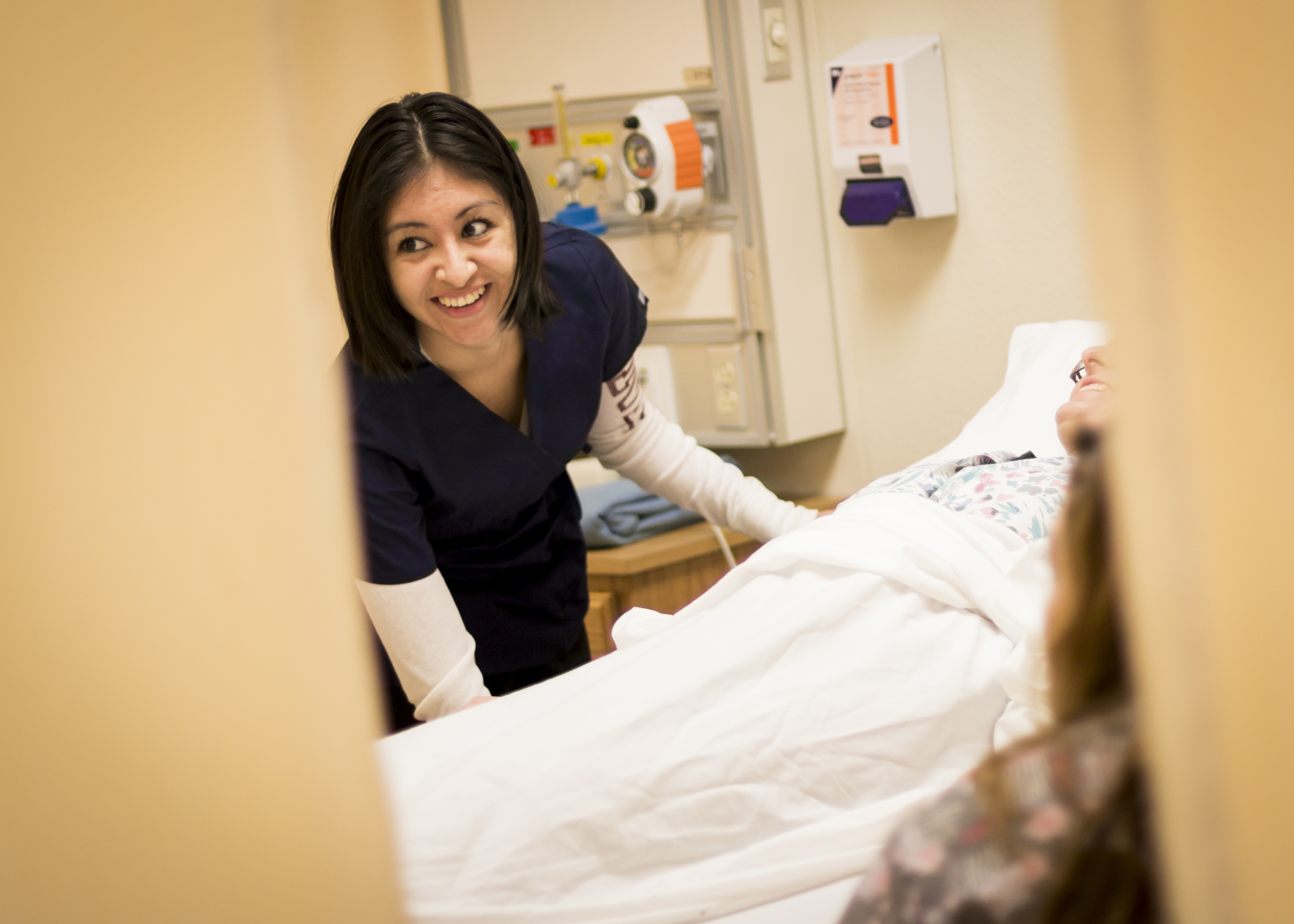
Certified nursing assistant student in Nevada

Unlicensed assistive personnel (UAP), including certified nursing assistants and home health aides, are paraprofessionals who assist individuals with physical disabilities, mental impairments, and other health care needs with their activities of daily living (ADLs). UAPs also provide bedside care—including basic nursing procedures—all under the supervision of a registered nurse, licensed practical nurse or other health care professional. UAPs must demonstrate their ability and competence before gaining any expanded responsibilities in a clinical setting. While providing this care, UAPs offer compassion and patience and are part of the patient's healthcare support system. Communication between UAPs and registered nurses (RNs) is key as they are working together in their patients' best interests. The scope of care UAPs are responsible for is delegated by RNs or other clinical licensed professionals.

UAPs care for patients in hospitals, residents of nursing facilities, clients in private homes, and others in need of their services due to old age or disability. By definition, UAPs do not hold a license or other mandatory professional requirements for practice, though many hold various certifications. They are collectively categorized under the group "personal care workers in health services" in the International Standard Classification of Occupations, 2008 revision.

== Scope of care ==
In the United States, the responsibilities and duties of a UAP include:

- Observing, documenting and reporting clinical and treatment information, including patients' behavioral changes
- Assisting with motion exercises and other rehabilitative measures
- Taking and recording blood pressure, temperature, pulse, respiratory rate (breaths per minute), blood oxygen saturation, and body weight
- Assisting with ambulation and mobilization of patients
- Removing peripheral IVs and Foley catheters before patients are discharged from the hospital
- Collecting specimens for required medical tests
- Checking blood glucose
- Measuring and recording intake and output (amount of food and drink consumed; amount of urine, stool, and vomit excreted)
- Emptying and recording the volume of surgical drains, such as Jackson-Pratt drains
- Providing emotional and support services to patients, their families and other caregivers
- Assisting with personal hygiene: bathing, oral hygiene, nail care, and grooming
- Assisting with dressing, repositioning, feeding, and toileting

Most UAPs, including nursing assistants, are not certified to change sterile dressings, distribute medications, insert or remove any tubing (such as nasogastric tubes), or conduct tube feedings. Such tasks should be therefore left to the overseeing nurse or clinical licensed professional. UAPs must be delegated responsibilities. The nurses are ultimately accountable for all the care patients receive as a result of their delegating. Due to the nursing shortage and to reduce the heavy workload placed on nurses, delegating tasks to UAPs and other nursing staff such as licensed practical nurses (LPNs) is crucial.

== Types and training ==
Nursing assistant, nursing auxiliary, auxiliary nurse, patient care technician, home health aide/assistant, geriatric aide/assistant, psychiatric aide, nurse aide, and nurse tech are all common titles for UAPs. There are some differences in scope of care across UAPs based on title and description.

Unlicensed assistive personnel are important members of the health care team who often hold a high level of experience and ability. While they do not require extensive health care training to practice their profession, manual dexterity and good interpersonal communication skills are usually necessary. They often undergo some formal education, apprenticeship or on-the-job training in areas such as body mechanics, nutrition, anatomy and physiology, cognitive impairments and mental health issues, infection control, personal care skills, and record-keeping.

Training for UAPs is available from various outlets such as home health care agencies, community colleges, vocational schools, eldercare programs, and on-the-job training.

=== Certified nursing assistant (CNA) ===
The National Association of Health Care Assistants defines the role of CNAs as:

"In the United States, certified nursing assistants typically work in a nursing home or hospital and perform everyday living tasks for the elderly, chronically sick, or rehabilitation patients who cannot care for themselves."

Many community colleges offer CNA training in one semester. Other educational programs offer accelerated programs. In some cases, skilled nursing facilities pay for a CNA course for their employees.

CNA certification requirements vary by state. The requirements generally include taking an accredited CNA course, passing the state's CNA written and practical exams, registering as a CNA within the state, and acquiring a minimum number of hours of supervised on-duty experience.

Moving to a different state requires recertification in the new state unless both states use the National Nurse Aide Assessment Program (NNAAP) standard. In that case, the new state accepts previous NNAAP test scores and allows registration. These certification exams are distributed by the state. Classes to study for these exams are provided by the American Red Cross as well as other providers. The Red Cross courses encompass everything in the state exams, from communication to health terms to sensitivity.

In the United States, CNAs must work a minimum number of hours every two years as specified by the state and have no records of abuse or neglect to keep their certification. Each state also has its own mandatory continuing education hours that CNAs must fulfill.

Similar titles in the United Kingdom and elsewhere include healthcare assistant (HCA), healthcare support worker, or clinical support worker. These providers usually work in hospitals or community settings under the guidance of a qualified healthcare professional.

In the United Kingdom, the Care Certificate was introduced in April 2015, following the Cavendish Review of April 2013 into standards of care among health care assistants and support workers in the NHS and social care settings.

The purpose of the Care Certificate is to "address inconsistencies in training and competencies in the workforce so that all staff have the same introductory skills, knowledge and behaviours to provide safe, high quality and compassionate care of the highest standards". The Care Certificate was jointly developed by Skills for Health, Health Education England and Skills for Care.

=== Home health aide (HHA) ===
A home health aide (HHA) provides in-home care for patients who need assistance with daily living beyond what family or friends can provide. Patients include those who have a physical or mental disability, are recovering from an injury or surgery, have a chronic illness, or are advanced in age. Training requirements to become an HHA are generally minimal and vary by state.

=== Personal support worker (PSW) ===
Personal support worker (PSW) is the title for a similar type of health worker in Canada. Personal support work is unique among health care professions in that the scope of a PSW's duties does not extend beyond what the client could do him/herself if the client were physically and cognitively able. No other profession's scope is similarly described. In Newfoundland and Labrador, a PSW is called a Personal Care Attendant (PCA).

In May 2011, Ontario's Ministry of Health and Long-Term Care (MOHLTC) announced the creation of a Registry of Personal Support Workers to acknowledge the care it provides daily to some of Ontario's most vulnerable populations, including seniors and people with chronic illnesses and disabilities. The Ontario PSW Registry was launched on June 1, 2012, and now has over 23,000 registered PSWs.

=== Surgical technologist ===
Surgical technologists are considered UAPs in the US, where they are also sometimes called "scrub tech". The title can mean different things in other countries. In Mozambique, for example, surgical technologists are medical professionals trained and registered to perform advanced clinical procedures including emergency surgery.

=== Birth Assistant ===
Birth attendants, such as doulas, childbirth educators and other persons providing emotional support and general care and advice to women and families during pregnancy and childbirth, are also typically considered UAPs. They are distinguished from midwives, physicians, nurses, and other professionals who are trained and licensed to provide basic and emergency pregnancy and childbirth-related health care services and manage complications.

== Practice ==
In the context of aging populations and health care reform, there is growing demand for UAPs in many countries. But without formal qualifications, UAPs are often unable to perform some tasks due to issues of liability and legality. Some places have made attempts to regulate, control, and verify education. This allows an employer to verify experience and knowledge as well as assist in preventing individuals who have been "struck" (had registration/certification invalidated) from continuing to work in healthcare roles. In the UK, for example, the credibility of the Healthcare Assistant and other social care workers is intended to be strengthened by their compulsory registration from 2009 with the General Social Care Council in England or its Scottish or Welsh equivalents.

In the United States, families and employers can verify a UAP's certification by checking the state's nursing registry. Each state is required to maintain an updated nursing registry under the 1987 Omnibus Budget Reconciliation Act (OBRA). The registry details valid certifications and reports of abuse or neglect. The background information these registries provide is important in protecting patients.

== Turnover and job stability ==
Typically, the turnover rate among an organization's UAPs is very high. One 2021 study found the turnover rate for UAPs working at American nursing homes to be 129%. Rapid turnover can be detrimental to patients' quality of care and cause stress and dissatisfaction among remaining employees. Turnover also increases costs for facilities, which must spend money to hire and train new employees.

Many factors contribute to staff turnover. Staff may leave because of low pay, long hours, mandatory overtime, physically taxing work, burnout, workplace violence, inadequate training, exposure to infectious disease, and a lack of opportunity for advancement in the organization. In the United States, most UAPs make close to minimum wage, and under half have health insurance through their employers.

UAPs also have higher than average rates of job-related injury; in fact, many UAPs experience workplace violence from patients and residents in their care. Patients and residents, especially those who are cognitively impaired or mentally ill, may hit, kick, pinch, bite, or verbally insult UAPs providing care. Many UAPs see this as simply part of the job. 83% of German UAPs have experienced workplace violence. UAPs working in long-term care are much more likely to experience workplace violence than UAPs working in hospitals. In a given year, 34% of American UAPs in long-term care facilities experience physical injury, including human bites, after a resident assaults them.

The COVID-19 pandemic also contributed to UAPs leaving the job in droves.

For-profit long-term care facilities have higher rates of turnover than not-for-profit facilities. Understaffing also contributes to turnover, which can lead to a vicious cycle: the high turnover rate contributes to understaffing, which contributes to more employees quitting.

Researchers and healthcare associations suggest that, to improve staff retention, employers should provide UAPs with higher wages, benefits, and pensions. Some studies also suggest that employers should provide prospective UAPs with realistic expectations of what the job entails. Other reports suggest using migrant workers to cover the UAP shortage.

== See also ==
- Activities of daily living assistance
- Health care provider
- Health human resources
- Nursing
- Orderly
