= Central council =

Central Council may refer to:

== Cultural and Religious organisations ==
- Central Council of Muslims in Germany (Zentralrat der Muslime in Deutschland)
- Central Council of Jews in Germany (Zentralrat der Juden in Deutschland)
- Central Council of Oriental Christians in Germany (Zentralrat Orientalischer Christen in Deutschland)
- Central Council of Ex-Muslims (Zentralrat der Ex-Muslime)
- Central Council of German Sinti and Roma (Zentralrat Deutscher Sinti und Roma)

== Trade Unions ==
- Central Council of Afghan Trade Unions
- Central Council of Trade Unions

== Medical organisations ==
- Central Council of Indian Medicine
- Central Council of Physical Recreation
- Central Council of Homoeopathy

== Other ==
- Central Council of Probation and After-Care Committees
- Central Council for Education and Training in Social Work

== Political organisations ==
- Latvian Central Council
- Palestinian Central Council
- Central Council of Ukraine
- The Central Council of Dada for the World Revolution
