= Social care in the United Kingdom =

Social care in the United Kingdom is a devolved matter, so England, Northern Ireland, Scotland and Wales each have their own separate systems of private and publicly funded social care. Each country has differing policies, priorities and funding levels which has resulted in a variety of differences existing between the systems.

According to the Organisation for Economic Co-operation and Development the UK had one of the lowest government expenditures in Western Europe per head of the population at £695 in 2018 as compared with £1,530 in Norway, £1,451 in the Netherlands, £1,222 in Sweden or £1,033 in Switzerland, though higher than Spain or Portugal with £218 and £208 per head, respectively.

For details, see:

- Social care in England
- Social care in Scotland
- Health and Social Care in Northern Ireland
- Social care in Wales

== UK-wide social care organisations ==
- British Association of Social Workers
- Carers UK
- Central Council for Education and Training in Social Work
- Brainkind
- Leonard Cheshire Disability
- Nuffield Trust
- Social Care Institute for Excellence
- Southern Cross Healthcare
- Sue Ryder Care
- Turning Point

== See also ==
- Healthcare in the United Kingdom
- National Minimum Data Set for Social Care
- Approved mental health professional
- Approved social worker
