= Canadian Institute for Human Services =

Canadian learned society

- Founded: March 11, 2014; 12 years ago
- Type: Learned society
- Region served: Canada

The Canadian Institute for Human Services (CIHS) is an advocacy, education and action research organization for the advancement of health equity, progressive education, and social innovation. The institute collaborates with researchers, field practitioners, community organizations, socially conscious companies—along with various levels of government and educational institutions—to ensure that the Canadian human services sector remains accountable to the greater good of Canadian civil society rather than short-term professional, business or economic gains.

== History ==
The Canadian Institute for Human Services was federally incorporated on March 11, 2014 and was governed under the Canada Not-for-profit Corporations Act. It was dissolved by the corporation (s. 220) on 2016-09-26

== See also ==
- Civil resistance
- Critical Theory
- Counterculture of the 1960s
- Community mental health
- Ethics of care
- Feminist Movement
- Health and Social Care
- Humanistic Education
- Humanistic Psychology
- Human Potential Movement
- Human services
- Political Economy
- Postmodernism
- Psychology
- Poor laws
- Recovery approach, movement
- Social care in England
- Social Work
- Sociology
- Harold Lawrence McPheeters, "father of human services"
