= Human services =

Interdisciplinary field of study

Human services is an interdisciplinary field of study with the objective of meeting human needs through an applied knowledge base, focusing on prevention as well as remediation of problems, and maintaining a commitment to improving the overall quality of life of service populations. The process involves the study of social technologies (practice methods, models, and theories), service technologies (programs, organizations, and systems), and scientific innovations designed to ameliorate problems and enhance the quality of life of individuals, families and communities to improve the delivery of service with better coordination, accessibility and accountability. The mission of human services is to promote a practice that involves simultaneously working at all levels of society (whole-person approach) in the process of promoting the autonomy of individuals or groups, making informal or formal human services systems more efficient and effective, and advocating for positive social change within society.

Human services practitioners strive to advance the autonomy of service users through civic engagement, education, health promotion and social change at all levels of society. Practitioners also engage in advocating so human systems remain accessible, integrated, efficient and effective.

Human services academic programs can be easily accessible in colleges and universities, which award degrees at the associate, baccalaureate, and graduate levels. Human services programs are in countries all around the world.

== History ==
=== United States ===
Human services has its roots all of the in charitable activities of religious and civic organizations that date back to the Colonial period. However, the academic discipline of human services did not start until the 1960s. At that time, a group of college academics started the new human services movement and began to promote the adoption of a new ideology about human service delivery and professionalism among traditional helping disciplines. The movement's major goal was to make service delivery more efficient, effective, and humane. The other goals dealt with the reeducation of traditional helping professionals to have a greater appreciation of the individual as a whole person (humanistic psychology) and to be accountable to the communities they serve (postmodernism). Furthermore, professionals would learn to take responsibility at all levels of government, use systems approaches to consider human problems, and be involved in progressive social change.

Traditional academic programs such as education, nursing, social work, law and medicine were resistant to the new human services movement's ideology because it appeared to challenge their professional status. Changing the traditional concept of professionalism involved rethinking consumer control and the distribution of power. The new movement also called on human service professionals to work for social change. It was proposed that reducing monopolistic control on professionals could result in democratization of knowledge, thus leading to said professionals counteracting dominant establishments and advocating on behalf of their clients and communities. The movement also hoped that human service delivery systems would become integrated, comprehensive, and more accessible, which would make them more humane for service users. Ultimately, the resistance from traditional helping professions served as the impetus for a group of educators in higher education to start the new academic discipline of human services.

Some maintain that the human services discipline has a concrete identity as a profession that supplements and complements other traditional professions. Yet other professionals and scholars have not agreed upon an authoritative definition for human services.

== Academic programs ==
=== United States ===
==== Development ====
Chenault and Burnford argued that human services programs must inform and train students at the graduate or postgraduate level if human services hoped to be considered a professional discipline. A progressive graduate human services program was established by Audrey Cohen (1931–1996), who was considered an innovative educator for her time. The Audrey Cohen College of Human Services, now called the Metropolitan College of New York, offered one of the first graduate programs in 1974. In the same time period, Springfield College in Massachusetts became a major force in preserving human services as an academic discipline. Currently, Springfield College is one of the oldest and largest human services program in the United States.

Manpower studies in the 1960s and 70s had shown that there would be a shortage of helping professionals in an array of service delivery areas. In turn, some educators proposed that the training of nonprofessionals (e.g., mental health technicians) could bridge this looming personnel shortage. One of the earliest educational initiatives to develop undergraduate curricula was undertaken by the Southern Regional Education Board (SREB), which was funded by the National Institute on Health. Professionals of the SREB Undergraduate Social Welfare Manpower Project helped colleges develop new social welfare programs, which later became known as human services. Some believed community college human services programs were the most expedient way to train paraprofessionals for direct service jobs in areas such as mental health. Currently, a large percentage of human services programs are run at the community college level.

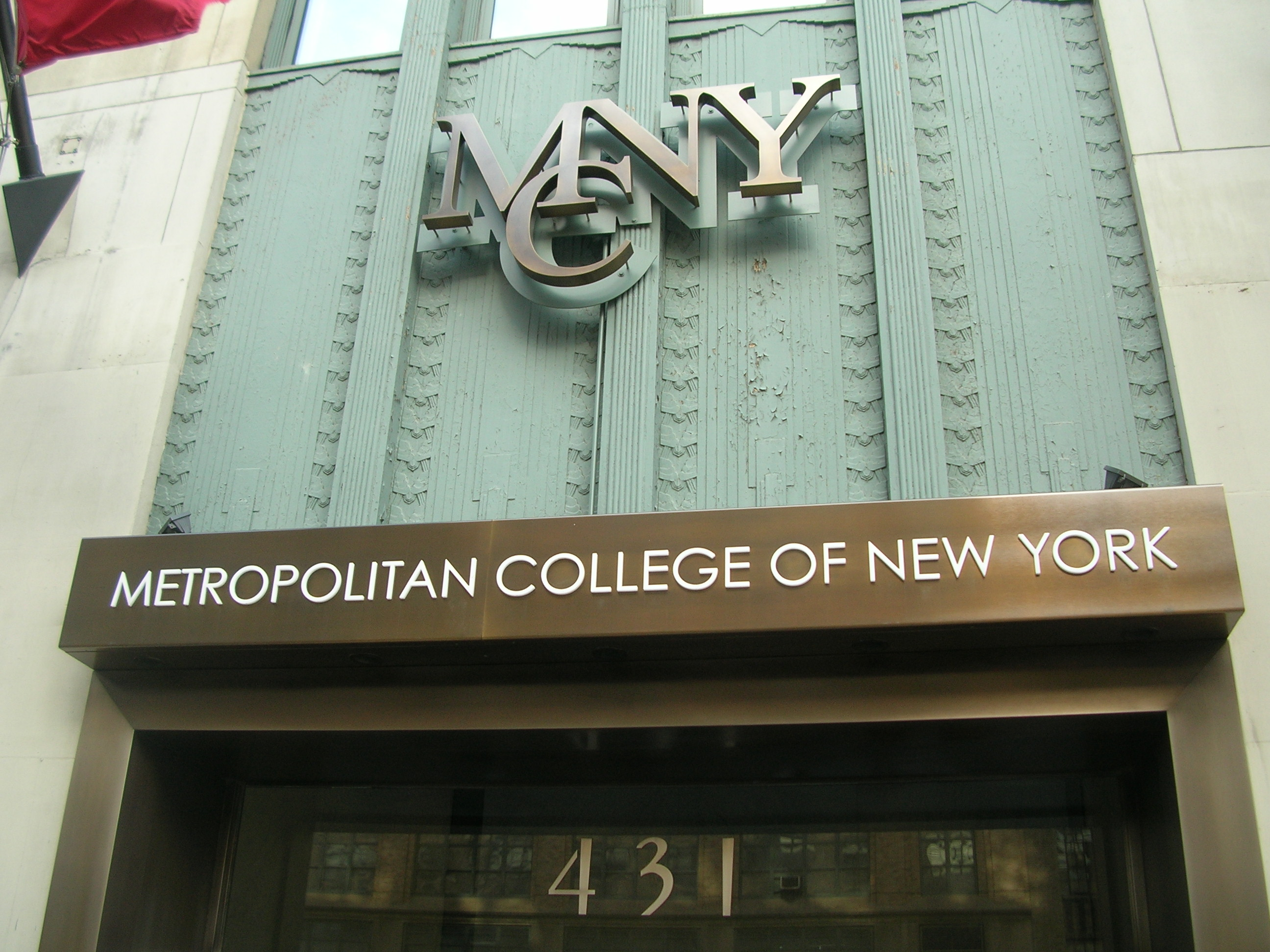
Photo of the Metropolitan College of New York, which offered one of the first graduate human services programs in 1974.

The development of community college human services programs was supported with government funding that was earmarked for the federal new careers initiatives. In turn, the federally funded New Careers Program was created to produce a nonprofessional career track for economically disadvantaged, underemployed, and unemployed adults as a strategy to eradicate poverty within society and to end a critical shortage of health-care personnel. Graduates from these programs successfully acquired employment as paraprofessionals, but there were limitations to their upward mobility within social service agencies because they lacked a graduate or professional degree.

==== Current programs ====
Currently, there are academic programs in human services at the associate, baccalaureate, and graduate levels. There are approximately 600 human services programs throughout the United States. An online directory of human services programs lists many (but not all) of the programs in conjunction with their accreditation status from the Council for Standards in Human Services Education (CSHSE).

The CSHSE offers accreditation for human services programs in higher education. The accreditation process is voluntary and labor-intensive; it is designed to assure the quality, consistency, and relevance of human service education through research-based standards and a peer-review process. According to the CSHSE's webpage there are only 43 accredited human services programs in the United States.

Human services curricula are based on an interdisciplinary knowledge foundation that allows students to consider practical solutions from multiple disciplinary perspectives. Across the curriculum human services students are often taught to view human problems from a socioecological perspective (developed by Urie Bronfenbrenner) that involves viewing human strengths and problems as interconnected to a family unit, community, and society. This perspective is considered a "whole-person perspective". Overall, undergraduate programs prepare students to be human services generalists while master's programs prepare students to be human services administrators, and doctoral programs prepare students to be researcher-analysts and college-level educators. Research in this field focuses on an array of topics that deal with direct service issues, case management, organizational change, management of human service organizations, advocacy, community organizing, community development, social welfare policy, service integration, multiculturalism, integration of technology, poverty issues, social justice, development, and social change strategies.

== Certification and continuing education ==
=== United States Of America ===
Not all graduates from human services programs can obtain a Human Services Board Certified Practitioner (HS-BCP) credential offered by the Center for Credentialing & Education (CCE). The HS-BCP certification ensures that human services practitioners offer quality services, are competent service providers, are committed to high standards, and adhere to the NOHS Ethical Standards of Human Service Professionals, as well as to help solidify the professional identity of human services practitioners. HS-BCPE Experience Requirements for the certification: HS-BCP applicants must meet post-graduation experience requirements to be eligible to take the examination. However, graduates of a CSHSE accredited degree program may sit for the HS-BCP exam without verifying their human services work experience. Otherwise experience requirements for candidates not from a CSHSE accredited program are as follows: Associate degree with post degree experience requires three years, including a minimum of 4,500 hours; Bachelor's Degree with post degree experience requires two years, including a minimum of 3,000 hours; Master's or Doctorate with post degree experience requires one year, including a minimum of 1,500 hours.

The HS-BCP exam is designed to verify a candidate's human services knowledge. The exam was created as a collaborative effort of human services subject-matter experts and normed on a population of professionals in the field. The HS-BCP exam covers the following areas:

1. Assessment, treatment planning, and outcome evaluation
2. Theoretical orientation/interventions
3. Case management, professional practice, and ethics
4. Administration, program development/evaluation, and supervision

== Tools and methodology ==
There are numerous different tools and methods utilized in human services. For example, qualitative and quantitative surveys are administered to define community problems that need addressing. These surveys can narrow down what service is needed, who would receive it, for how long, and where the problem is concentrated. Additional necessary skills include strong communication and professional coordination- since networking is crucial for obtaining and transporting resources to areas of need. Lack of these skills could lead to dangerous consequences as a communities needs are not adequately met. Furthermore, research is a key component to the successful conduct of human service. Both theoretical and empirical research is required if one is to pursue a career in human services because being uninformed can leave communities in confusion and disarray- thus perpetuating the problem that was supposed to be resolved. In relation to social work, a professional must be unbiased and patient because they will be closely working with a vast and diverse population who are often in extremely dire situations. Allowing one's personal beliefs to bleed into their human service profession could negatively impact the quality of and or limit the scope of potential outreach.

== Employment outlook ==
=== United States ===
Currently, the three major employment roles played by human services graduates include providing direct service, performing administrative work, and working in the community. According to the Occupational Outlook Handbook, published by the US Department of Labor, the employment of human service assistants is anticipated to grow by 34% through 2016, which is faster than average for all occupations. There are several different occupations for individuals with post-secondary degrees. Specialization is crucial when applying for a human service career because many different job occupations and skills fall under the broad scope of human services, especially if said job is related to social work. This is because many different types of people require different types of aid. For example, a child would need special attention compared to an adult- and would visit a professional who has trained directly with younger people. Furthermore, an alcoholic or addict would specifically need a professional rehabilitation counselor. On the other hand, a victim of a natural disaster would need a crisis support worker for immediate assistance. Other examples of human service jobs include but are not limited to; criminology, community service, housing, health, therapy, and sociology.

== Professional organizations ==
=== North America ===
There are several different professional human services organizations for professionals, educators, and students to join across North America.

==== United States ====
The National Organization for Human Services (NOHS) is a professional organization open to educators, professionals, and students interested in current issues in the field of human services. NOHS sponsors an annual conference in different parts of the United States. In addition, there are four independent human services regional organizations: (a) Mid-Atlantic Consortium for Human Services, (b) Midwest Organization for Human Services, (c) New England Organization for Human Service, and the (d) Northwest Human Services Association. All the regional organizations are also open to educators, professionals, students and each regional organization has an annual conference in different locations throughout their region such as universities or institutions.

Human services special interest groups also exist within the American Society for Public Administration (ASPA) and the American Educational Research Association (AERA). The ASPA subsection is named the Section on Health and Human Services Administration and its purpose is to foster the development of knowledge, understanding and practice in the fields of health and human services administration and to foster professional growth and communication among academics and practitioners in these fields. Fields of health and human services administration share a common and unique focus on improving the quality of life through client-centered policies and service transactions.

The AERA special interest group is named the Education, Health and Human Service Linkages. Its purpose is to create a community of researchers and practitioners interested in developing knowledge about comprehensive school health, school linked services, and initiatives that support children and their families. This subgroup also focuses on interpersonal collaboration, integration of services, and interdisciplinary approaches. The group's interests encompass interrelated policy, practice, and research that challenge efforts to create viable linkages among these three distinct areas.

The American Public Human Services Association (APHSA) is a nonprofit organization that pursues distinction in health and human services by working with policymakers, supporting state and local agencies, and working with partners to promote innovative, integrative and efficient solutions in health and human services policy and practice. APHSA has individual and student memberships.

==== Canada ====
The Canadian Institute for Human Services is an advocacy, education and action-research organization for the advancement of health equity, progressive education and social innovation. The institute collaborates with researchers, field practitioners, community organizations, socially conscious companies—along with various levels of government and educational institutions—to ensure the Canadian health and human services sector remains accountable to the greater good of Canadian civil society rather than short-term professional, business or economic gains.

== See also ==
- Civil resistance
- Critical Theory
- Counterculture of the 1960s
- Community mental health
- Ethics of care
- Feminist Movement
- Health and Social Care
- Humanistic Education
- Humanistic Psychology
- Human Potential Movement
- Political Economy
- Postmodernism
- Psychology
- Poor laws
- Social care in England
- Social policy
- Social Work
- Sociology
- Harold Lawrence McPheeters, "father of human services"
