= Trade unions in Afghanistan =

- National organization(s): None
- Regulatory authority: None
- Primary legislation: N/A

International Labour Organization
- Afghanistan is a member of the ILO

Convention ratification
- Freedom of Association: Not ratified
- Right to Organise: Not ratified

Trade unions in Afghanistan have a brief and turbulent history, beginning in 1967 and effectively ending with the Islamic state of the Mujahideen. There has been no reported trade union activity since the military intervention and removal of the Taliban regime.

Afghanistan has not ratified the ILO conventions; the Freedom of Association and Protection of the Right to Organise Convention, 1948 and the Right to Organise and Collective Bargaining Convention, 1949.

== History ==
The first trade unions in Afghanistan were formed in 1967. The People’s Democratic Party of Afghanistan established the Central Council of Afghan Trade Unions (CCATU) in 1978. In December 1979 the CCATU was purged and restructured by the intervening Soviet Union regime into the sole Afghan trade union. The CCATU functioned along similar lines as other Soviet trade unions, claiming to work both for the improvement of working and living conditions, and "defending the gains made by the Sowr (i.e. 1978) Revolution."

At the 1990 Congress the CCATU became the National Workers' Union of Afghanistan (NUWA), retaining most of the previous leadership.

In 1992 with the dominance of the Mujahideen, and the declaration of an Islamic state, the NUWA ceased to exist.

The New Unionism Network Global Union Directory lists the following unions functioning in Afghanistan today, along with membership numbers and contact details:

- All Afghanistan Federation of Trade Unions
- All Afghanistan Women's Union
- Afghanistan Federation of Trade Unions
- Afghanistan International Journalists' Association
- Afghan Labour Organisation
- Afghanistan Lawyers' Union
- Afghanistan National Powerful Workers' Union
- Afghanistan Teachers' Association
- Afghanistan Teachers' Support Association
- Central Council of National Unions of Afghanistan Employees
- National Journalists' Union
