= Social Work England =

Profession regulator

Agency overview
- Jurisdiction: Government of the United Kingdom
- Headquarters: Sheffield
- Employees: 236
- Agency executives: Colum Conway, chief executive and accounting officer; Andrew McCulloch, chair of the board
- Parent agency: Department for Education

Social Work England (SWE) is the profession regulator for social workers in England. SWE operates as a non-departmental public body.

== History ==
=== Predecessors ===
In 1970, the Central Council for the Education and Training of Social Workers (CCETSW) was established in the UK with a specific remit to promote the quality of social work training and education. The CCETSW remained in place until the passing of the Care Standards Act 2000 that required for the first time that all social workers in England be registered, and thus obligated them to abide by the standards and rules of the new regulator, the General Social Care Council (GSCC).

=== Formation ===
In the 2016 report Children’s Social Care Reform: A Vision for Change, the Department for Education announced their intention to create a new regulatory organisation for social workers in England that would come to be SWE.

Social Work England was established under the Children and Social Work Act 2017. In December 2019, Social Work England officially took over as the regulator for social workers in England.

== Governance ==
=== List of chairs ===
No	Image	Chair	Term	Term length	Ref(s)
1		Kamlesh Patel	19 March 2018 – 28 February 2023	4 years, 11 months, and 9 days	
2	–	Andrew McCulloch	1 March 2023 – Present	3 years, 2 months, and 28 days	

== See also ==
- Social care in England
- Northern Ireland Social Care Council (NISCC), the equivalent regulator in Northern Ireland.
- Scottish Social Services Council (SSSC), the equivalent regulator in Scotland.
- Social Care Wales (SCW), the equivalent regulator in Wales.
