= No Secrets =

No Secrets may refer to:

== Music ==
- No Secrets (group), an American-British girl group
  - No Secrets (No Secrets album), 2002, or the title song
- No Secrets (Carly Simon album), 1972
- "No Secrets" (The Angels song), 1980
- No Secrets (Jessie J song), 2025
- No Secrets, a 2017 EP by Barry Zito

== Other uses ==
- No Secrets (adult protection), a UK Government publication guidance
- A Touch of the Sun (1979 film), also known as No Secrets
- No Secrets, a 2013 book by Anuj Dhar

== See also ==
- "We Have No Secrets", a song by Carly Simon, on her 1972 album
