= Caring Times =

British social care magazine

Caring Times is a British monthly management magazine for the social care sector, focused mainly on residential care for people with dementia. Starting in 1988, it was published by Hawker Publications Ltd of Battersea. In February 2019, Caring Times was bought out by Investor Publishing.

Caring Times organises the National Care Awards, an annual event to recognise efforts within the social care sector. The Indian Community Centre Association in Nottingham won top prize in 2014.
