= Nuwa (disambiguation) =

Nuwa or NUWA may refer to:

- Nüwa, a Chinese creator goddess
- Jingwei, a Chinese mythological character who was known as Nüwa (unrelated to the creator goddess), the daughter of the Yandi, in her former life
- Kawaiisu or Nuwa, a Native American group in southern California
- 150 Nuwa, an asteroid
- National Workers' Union of Afghanistan
