= Operating department practitioner =

Type of health care provider

In the United Kingdom, operating department practitioners (ODPs) are allied healthcare professionals who are involved in the planning and delivery of perioperative care. As the name suggests, they are primarily employed in surgical operating departments, but they may also work directly within (or further their training to facilitate working within) a variety of acute clinical settings, including pre-hospital emergency care, emergency departments, intensive care units (ICUs), endoscopy suites, interventional radiology, cardiac catheter suites, obstetric theatres and reproductive medicine.

Operating department practitioners may be employed directly as, or may further their training to become, resuscitation officers, university lecturers, Hemostasis practitioners, education and development practitioners, departmental managers, perioperative team leaders, surgical care practitioners or quality improvement facilitators.

Operating department practitioners make up one of the 14 allied health professions as defined by NHS England and are professionally autonomous practitioners who hold a protected title within the United Kingdom. As of 2004 the profession has been regulated by the Health and Care Professions Council (HCPC) and thus falls under the remit of the chief allied health professions officer (CAHPO). The latest figures provided by the HCPC identifies that there are currently 17,325 ODPs registered (Aug 2025). ODPs are also supported and advised by their professional body, the College of Operating Department Practitioners (CODP). The college represents practitioners in various aspects of professional, educational and workplace matters, entering into its 75th year of existence in 2020. ODPs work as members of multi-disciplinary teams that include anaesthetists, surgeons, nurses, radiographers, physician's assistant and theatre support workers (TSWs). Since 2018, a "national operating department practitioner day" has been celebrated annually on 14 May, aiming to highlight their role within healthcare.

== Scope of practice ==
Operating department practitioners are subject to specific standards of proficiency as laid out by the Health & Care Professions Council. Alongside this, their professional role is also broadly defined by the College of Operating Department Practitioners (CODP)'s Scope of Practice document as published by the college in 2009. The college went on to publish a national curriculum document in 2018 which demonstrated the revised BSc (Hons) Operating Department Practice Curriculum.

- Anaesthetic (Pre and Intra-operative)
- Perioperative (Peri-operative)
- Post-Operative

=== Operating department practitioners ===
Operating department practitioners are healthcare professionals who provide assistance to anaesthetists, administering anaesthesia in the operating departments within hospitals.

Their primary role is to function in tandem alongside their colleagues in order to establish a team which can effectively provide and maintain safe anaesthesia during surgery. This role requires the application of evidence-based practice and critical thinking alongside a wide range of professional and clinical abilities.

Prior to surgery, anaesthetic operating department practitioners will be tasked with completing a thorough and detailed diagnostic check of the anaesthetic machine, ensuring it has met its safety requirements and is fully operational. This includes the correct function and availability of essential medical gases and associated ventilatory equipment and breathing apparatus. The ODP is also responsible for ensuring that critical controlled and emergency medications are accessible prior to the induction of anaesthesia. They are also routinely charged as being custodians of the controlled drugs/scheduled medications held within their dedicated theatre, being assigned security keys which remain on their person throughout the day.

Some ODPs are responsible for conducting pre-operative assessments of the patient prior to their admission to the department. These assessments may vary and are institutionally dependant, but may include assessment of the mouth opening, protruding or unsecure dentition, range of movement in the cervical spine, current pregnancy status, fasting status, past medical history, known medication/food allergy status, history of communicable diseases or blood borne viruses, history of post-operative nausea and vomiting or individual/familial adverse reaction to anaesthetic agents. During an emergency clinical scenario where immediate treatment and response is required, the anaesthetist [doctor] may verbally request that the anaesthetic practitioner administer prescribed medications in response to the situation in hand.

=== Perioperative practitioner ===
ODPs are trained to work directly alongside the surgical team performing surgery. This role is often referred to as the 'scrub' role. When performing this role they will prepare sterile instruments, swabs, consumables and any other equipment required throughout the patient's operation. They work alongside the surgeon(s) within the sterile field.

The 'scrubbed' ODP is accountable for the swabs, instruments, and needles and consumables used throughout an operation, to ensure nothing is retained within the operative site. They are trained to do several checks before closure of the skin, with the attendant circulating team member verifying accuracy.

ODPs may also be the 'first assistant' to the surgeon assisting throughout the operation.

ODPs can also when required, assist in a circulating role during the surgical stage of a patient's care. In this role, they pass extra materials to the surgical practitioner, help position the patient on the operating table, and plan ahead to supply what the surgical team may need. They may also set up extra equipment and act as a link between the surgical team and the rest of the hospital.

=== Postoperative practitioner ===
When a patient's operation has been satisfactorily completed and is 'rousable' by the anaesthetist, the patient will then be taken to the recovery area, where a qualified professional will monitor the patient's condition, providing airway management if needed and recognise and record the patient's physiological signs. The ODP may administer treatments, such as the administration of prescribed drugs, enabling the patient to fully recover from the effects of anaesthesia. The ODP will liaise with other departments and staff, such as the ward staff, porters, and consultants, to safely discharge the patient back to the ward environment.

== Training ==
A Diploma of Higher Education (DipHE) is the minimum standard of training required to work as an ODP in the United Kingdom. Since 2024, an undergraduate degree BSc (Hons) in Operating Department Practice is the common standard for entry into the profession. A BSC (Hons) requires three years. By 2010 there were 27 universities and colleges in the United Kingdom offering a qualification in operating department practice.

Apprenticeships programmes have recently been introduced, as an alternative pathway for individuals to train as ODPs. Apprentices are required to complete an HCPC-approved BSc (Hons) degree in Operating Department Practice, whilst additionally meeting the required 15 standards set out in the Care Certificate within three months of commencement. The duration of ODP apprenticeship courses, typically takes four years to complete.

Once qualified, ODPs can further their clinical and professional development by obtaining additional training or competencies related to their role. Courses are usually provided by their individual trusts or national providers such as universities or related colleges, RCOA. Additional skills including of but not limited to venepuncture, intravenous drug administration, peripheral venous cannulation, electrocardiography, peripherally inserted central catheter (PICC and midline) training and urinary catheterization.

As healthcare professionals, ODPs can also obtain certifications in cardiopulmonary resuscitation courses from the Resuscitation Council, including: immediate life support, paediatric immediate life support and advanced life support.

== Role expansion ==
With localised training within NHS trusts, ODPs can expand on their roles outside the traditional theatre setting. This has seen operating department practitioners being utilised, in other specialist roles and critical care settings within the hospital environment.

Qualified and experienced ODPs can apply and undertake approved training by the Royal College of Surgeons. Progressing to surgical care practitioners, assisting in some surgical procedures under the supervision of a consultant surgeon.

ODPs with a minimum of three years clinical experience with a degree level qualification, can apply for training to become an anaesthesia associate. Upon successful completion of an Anaesthesia Associate Postgraduate Diploma, practitioners are invited to become an affiliate of the Royal College of Anaesthetists.

== Titles ==
As an entry-level or continuous band 5 practitioner, the operating department practitioner title is usually stylised as either RODP (registered operating department practitioner) or simply ODP. With progression to a band 6/7 position, SODP (senior operating department practitioner) is commonly utilised. Band 8 ODP roles typically use the title of principle (PODP), manager, or any managerial variant.

Historically, the title of operating department assistant (ODA) was frequently used. The early 1990s saw an advancement of education and training, as a reflection the adoption of a practitioner title became more appropriate. The ODA designation after this time fell out of common practice. However, some ODPs who trained before this transition continue to refer to themselves by their former title.

== Areas of employment ==
With advancements in training, demand for staffing and recognition for their skill sets, ODPs are increasingly being employed in other areas found within a clinical setting. This however is not just limited to the hospital setting, where traditionally the role has flourished. The clinical environments where the ODP can operate are including but not limited to; Theatre departments, mobile theatres, ITU, cardiac ITU, endoscopy, interventional radiology, obstetric theatres, reproductive medicine, mental health clinics (ECT), A&E departments, clinical training departments, cardiac and medical emergency teams, blood transfusion practitioners, hospital transfer teams, general practice practitioners, academic university staff, operational team management, research departments, cardiac catheter suites, pre-surgery clinics, armed forces, recovery units, vaccination and screening teams, vascular device teams and clinics (hospital-based).

== Professional organizations ==
The HCPC recognises two professional bodies for ODPs:

- The College of Operating Department Practitioners (CODP), previously known as the Association of Operating Department Practitioners (AODP)

In late 2022, following a profession-wide consultation, members expressed a strong desire for the CODP to regain its independence, enabling it to have its own governance, membership model, and greater agility in pursuing professional development, education, and research initiatives. With UNISON's support during the transition, the CODP has now re-established itself as a standalone organisation once again, focusing on setting educational standards, promoting best clinical practice, and supporting ODPs' career progression, while maintaining a collaborative relationship with UNISON for trade union representation.

- The Association for Perioperative Practice (AfPP)

ODPs are also eligible to apply for associate membership with the Difficult Airway Society.

== See also ==
- Anaesthetic technician in New Zealand healthcare
- Surgical technologist in United States healthcare
