= No Secrets (adult protection) =

UK Government publication from the Department of Health

No Secrets, also known coequally as Adult Safeguarding, was a UK Government publication from the Department of Health which provided guidance on developing and implementing multi-agency policies and procedures to protect adults deemed "at risk" from harm and/or abuse. Its full title was "No secrets: guidance on developing and implementing multi-agency policies and procedures to protect vulnerable adults from abuse". It has now been replaced by statutory guidance issued under the Care Act 2014.

When the guidance was current, the Department of Health website stated that:

"It explains how commissioners and providers of health and social care services should work together to produce and implement local policies and procedures. They should collaborate with the public, voluntary and private sectors and they should also consult service users, their carers and representative groups. Local authority social services departments should co-ordinate the development of policies and procedures."

== History of No Secrets ==
The No Secrets (England) and In Safe Hands (Wales) documents were issued as guidance in 2000, under section 7 of the Local Authority Social Services Act 1970. Section 7 guidance does not carry the same status as legislation; instead local authorities have their compliance assessed as part of a statutory inspection process. With ‘good reason’ a local authority can ignore such guidance, but may be called upon to justify their actions in a judicial review.

When a referral is made to the local authority under adult protection / safeguarding, the case is allocated to a qualified social worker or specially trained care manager to undertake and investigate the allegation of abuse. The investigation can be a single agency led investigation, often led by the social worker or care manager or multi agency led, either with another statutory body such as the police, trading standards or a healthcare professional.

== Training of safeguarding social workers ==
There is no current national guidance or minimal standards relating to the training of social workers in the UK who investigate Adult Protection / Adult Safeguarding matters. However, in 2011, Keele University developed a master's degree in Adult Safeguarding. The MA in Safeguarding Adults: Law, Policy and Practice is offered by the School of Law.

A similar such course of study is provided by the Ulster University, in partnership with the Health and Social Care Trusts in Northern Ireland. The course is provided at Master's level. There are four modules available regarding various aspects of Social Work practice when safeguarding adults who are at risk of harm. This award winning program is the only course of its type in the UK and is designed to enable qualified Social Workers to reflect on their practice and work towards gaining academic credits as well as the Specialist Award in the Northern Ireland SW Post Qualifying framework.

== Adult protection failures ==
The Cornwall Adult protection committee serious case review into Mr Hoskins death referred to No Secrets.

The main reason for these and other failings (Stafford Hospital scandal, Margaret Panting, are the fact that these are the only government documents addressing the development of multi-disciplinary structures for adult protection, and they are only guidelines. although the Association of Directors of Social Services brought out what was essentially a best practice guide called ‘Safeguarding Adults' in 2005. Existing legislation only relates to paid social care. The majority of abuse happens in people’s own homes, often perpetrated by family, friends or neighbours. The majority of elder abuse occurs within the community, and specifically within people’s own homes and is often perpetrated by family members and relatives. In legislative terms however the primary thrust of government protective policy has focused upon the much smaller number of people in receipt of social care, and this has been regulated primarily through the Care Standards Act 2000 and more latterly the Safeguarding Vulnerable Groups Act 2006. Abuse within the community, unless perpetrated by paid domiciliary workers, is addressed through the No Secrets guidance.

=== More reasons for failure ===
The guidance has been effective in facilitating the creation of some form of adult protection system in all local authority areas, it has failed to deliver on a number of important issues, e.g.there is a lack of consistency and equality across areas in terms of the construction and level of adult protection systems provided, there is variable collaboration across statutory agencies, there are significant funding and staffing deficiencies in many areas, there is no consistency in the timing and duration of investigations, and there is no power to ensure access to victims, or to ensure safe outcomes. Lack of legislative underpinning was major reason for the inconsistent application of the No Secrets guidance. Organizations and individuals firstly do what is legally required of them (their statutory duty), and only as a secondary activity consider those matters that fall into the category of a ‘statutory power’ i.e. what they are authorized but not compelled to do. It is argued that there is insufficient funding, and adult protection work minimal. Some statutory agencies may invest what is necessary to maintain a skeleton response, with other agencies perceiving the work to be optional.

=== Final criticisms and a proposed way forward ===
Another criticism is personalisation -empowering people’s choice and control over care through the provision of direct payments or individual budgets – no effective safeguards being pre-planned or proposed -by accepting a personalisation package someone loses the automatic safeguards of the Care Standards Act 2000 and the Safeguarding Vulnerable Groups Act 2006 systems become optional.

There are still many discrepancies with some agencies providing clear policies and procedures and others only functioning at a very basic level.

== Current arrangements ==
On 1 April 2015 the 'No Secrets' guidance document was repealed by the Care Act 2014. This act contains replacement and mandatory requirements specifically around adult safeguarding and guidance now issued has statutory force and effect.
