= Nurses Agencies Act 1957 =

Act of the Parliament of the United Kingdom

Nurses Agencies Act 1957 (Note: Section 10(1).)
- Act of Parliament
- Parliament of the United Kingdom
- Long title: An Act to consolidate certain enactments relating to agencies for the supply of nurses.
- Citation: 5 & 6 Eliz. 2. c. 16
- Territorial extent: England and Wales (Note: Section 10(2).)

Dates
- Royal assent: 21 March 1957
- Commencement: 21 April 1957 (Note: Section 10(3).)
- Repealed: England: 1 July 2002; Wales: 2 October 2003
Other legislation
Amends	See § Repealed enactments
Repeals/revokes	See § Repealed enactments
Amended by	London Government Act 1963; Secretary of State for Social Services Order 1968; Local Government Act 1972; Statute Law (Repeals) Act 1974; Nurses, Midwives and Health Visitors Act 1979; Statute Law (Repeals) Act 1981; Criminal Justice Act 1982; Statute Law (Repeals) Act 1993; Local Government (Wales) Act 1994
Repealed by	Care Standards Act 2000
Relates to	Nurses Act 1957

Status: Repealed

Text of statute as originally enacted

Revised text of statute as amended

The Nurses Agencies Act 1957 (5 & 6 Eliz. 2. c. 16) was an act of the Parliament of the United Kingdom that consolidated enactments relating to agencies for the supply of nurses in England and Wales.

== Provisions ==
=== Repealed enactments ===
Section 9(1) of the act repealed 2 enactments, listed in the schedule to the act.

Citation	Short title	Extent of repeal
6 & 7 Geo. 6. c. 17	Nurses Act 1943	Part II and, so far as relating thereto, sections sixteen and twenty. Section twenty-one.
8 & 9 Geo. 6. c. 6	Nurses Act 1945	The whole act.

== Subsequent developments ==
Section 9(1) of, and the schedule to, the act were repealed by section 1 of, and part XI of the schedule to, the Statute Law (Repeals) Act 1974, which came into force on 27 June 1974.

The whole act was repealed by section 111(1) of, and schedule 6 to, the Care Standards Act 2000, which came into force on 1 July 2002 in England and 2 October 2003 in Wales.
