= Social Care Institute for Excellence =

Social Care Institute for Excellence (SCIE)
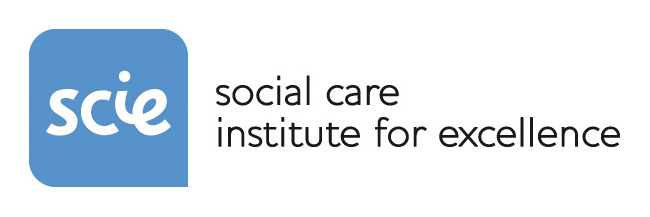
- Founded: 2001
- Type: Charity, improvement agency
- Location: United Kingdom
- Key people: Paul Burstow, Chair Kathryn Smith, Chief Executive Ewan King, Chief Operating Officer
- Website: www.scie.org.uk

The Social Care Institute for Excellence (SCIE; pronounced 'sky') is a UK charity and improvement agency. SCIE provides consultancy, resources, and training with the aim of improving social work and social care in the United Kingdom.

It produces guidance in a range of formats, including specialist tool kits, webinars, and e-learning modules covering management and policy issues as well as day-to-day service provision. These materials are co-produced with people who use services, carers, providers, commissioners, policymakers, and researchers.

== History ==
SCIE was established in 2001. It gained charitable status, which contributed to its survival of the 2010 UK quango reforms while other agencies were abolished or merged.

SCIE maintains Social Care Online, which was originally launched in 2005. This is the UK's biggest database of social care and social work information including wide-scale research, reports, government and policy documents, journal articles, and websites.

The organisation's funding received from the government fell to £4.4 million in 2013−14 (with £1m of this intended for specific projects), having previously been more than £20m in 2009−10 (of which £14m was allocated to specific projects).

SCIE was commissioned by the Department of Health and Social Care to provide support over the Care Act 2014, looking at issues such as assessment and eligibility, safeguarding adults and advocacy.

== Current practice ==
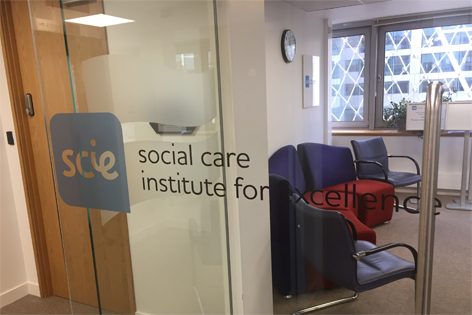
The SCIE logo displayed at their current offices in Central London

SCIE continues to produce a number of free resources for social care and social work staff at all levels.

In recent years they have evolved from a largely government-funded body to a more commercial organisation, increasing their income from training and consultancy work and becoming less reliant on the Department of Health and Social Care for funding.

Much of their current work focuses on transformation of care systems and implementing person-centred practice such as strengths-based approaches. They also have a large body of work on integration of health and social care, having provided national support as part of their work with the Better Care Fund.

SCIE continue to develop resources on safeguarding adults and children, on the Mental Capacity Act 2005, and on Deprivation of Liberty Safeguards.

One of their core aims is to improve participation and Co-production (public services) with people who use services and carers to develop and deliver better social care and health provision. Much of their work encompasses this principle.

== See also ==
- Department of Health and Social Care
- National Institute for Health and Clinical Excellence
- Paul Burstow (Chair of the Social Care Institute for Excellence)
