= General Social Care Council =

The General Social Care Council (GSCC) was a non-departmental public body of the Department of Health in the United Kingdom which was the regulator of social workers and social work students in England between 2001 and 2012. It set down codes of conduct for social workers and social work employers, and maintained a register of around 100,000 social workers and students, using a conduct model to regulate and discipline registrants.

== Creation and closure ==
The GSCC was set up in 2001 further to the Care Standards Act 2000, which was enacted partly in response to criticisms in the late 1990s of social services in Britain, in particular the high-profile case of Victoria Climbié, a young girl who was abused and eventually killed by her relatives in north London despite having been known to local social services. The GSCC inherited the role of the Central Council for Education and Training in Social Work (CCETSW), a previous body which had responsibility for regulating and funding social work education and the accreditation of social workers. The GSCC was given a broader remit to take a lead not only in education but in the strategic development and promotion of the whole social care sector in Britain.

After the formation of a Coalition government in 2010, the General Social Care Council was earmarked for abolition as part of a drive to reduce the number and cost of publicly funded organisations. On 31 July 2012 it closed, and the regulation of social workers was taken over by the Health Professions Council, which was renamed the Health and Care Professions Council to reflect its expanded role. The GSCC's sister organisations in the other countries of the United Kingdom – the Scottish Social Services Council (SSSC), the Care Council for Wales (in Welsh: Cyngor Gofal Cymru), and the Northern Ireland Social Care Council – continued to exist with their functions intact.

At the time of its closure, the chair of the General Social Care Council was Rosie Varley, and its chief executive was Penny Thompson.

== Successors ==
The Health and Care Professions Council regulated social workers until December 2019 when the function was transferred to Social Work England, a new non-departmental public body established by the Children and Social Work Act 2017.

== See also ==
- Social care in England
