= Health and Care Professions Council =

UK regulator of selected health and care professions (2003- )

- Abbreviation: HCPC
- Predecessor: Council for Professions Supplementary to Medicine
- Formation: 1 April 2002
- Type: Statutory regulator
- Purpose: To protect the public
- Region served: United Kingdom
- Members: 281,000 (2020)
- Parent organization: Professional Standards Authority
- Staff: 300 (2023/24)
- Website: www.hcpc-uk.org

The Health and Care Professions Council (HCPC), formerly the Health Professions Council (HPC), is a statutory regulator of over 280,000 professionals from 15 health and care professions in the United Kingdom. The Council reports its main purpose is to protect the public. It does this by setting and maintaining standards of proficiency and conduct for the professions it regulates. Its key functions include approving education and training programmes which health and care professionals must complete before they can register with the HCPC; and maintaining and publishing a Register of health and care providers who meet predetermined professional requirements and standards of practice.

== History ==
On 1 April 2002, the Health Professions Council replaced the Council for Professions Supplementary to Medicine (CPSM) which had been established in 1960.

By 2005, thirteen protected titles were regulated by the HPC: arts therapists; biomedical scientists; chiropodists/podiatrists; clinical scientists; dieticians; occupational therapists; operating department practitioners; orthoptists; paramedics; physiotherapists; prosthetists and orthotists; radiographers; and speech and language therapists.

In July 2010, the decision was taken to transfer the professional regulation of social workers to the Health Professions Council, which was renamed the Health and Care Professions Council (HCPC). The regulation of social workers moved to the HCPC on 1 August 2012 under the Health and Social Care Act 2012. The General Social Care Council (GSCC) – which previously regulated social workers – was abolished on 31 July 2012. The strap line that they use was also changed to "Regulating health, psychological and social work professionals" which was considered better suited to describe the diversity of professionals that they regulate. The HCPC has also reported it was being accorded new powers to set up voluntary registers for unregulated professions or related professions, including students seeking to enter a regulated or unregulated profession or related occupation.

The work of the HCPC and other health professions regulators in the UK (the General Medical Council, Nursing and Midwifery Council, General Dental Council, etc.) is overseen by the Professional Standards Authority.

On 2 December 2019, the regulation of social workers in England was transferred to a new body, Social Work England.

== Professions regulated by the HCPC ==
The HCPC regulates 15 categories of health and care professionals. They are:

Category	Protected Titles	Number of registrants	Professional bodies
Arts therapists	Art Psychotherapist; Art Therapist; Dramatherapist; Music Therapist	4,725	British Association of Art Therapists; British Association of Dramatherapists; British Association for Music Therapy
Biomedical scientists	Biomedical Scientist	23,785	Institute of Biomedical Science
Chiropodists/podiatrists	Chiropodist; Podiatrist	13,106	The Society of Chiropodists & Podiatrists; The British Chiropody and Podiatry Association; The Institute of Chiropodists and Podiatrists; The Alliance of Private Sector Chiropody and Podiatry Practitioners
Clinical Scientists	Clinical Scientist	6,917	Association of Clinical Scientists (ACS) Institute of Physics and Engineering in Medicine (IPEM)
Dietitians	Dietitian	10,136	British Dietetic Association
Hearing aid dispensers	Hearing aid dispenser	3,263	British Society of Hearing Aid Audiologists (BSHAA)
Occupational therapists	Occupational Therapist	39,495	Royal College of Occupational Therapists
Operating department practitioners	Operating Department Practitioner	14,351	College of Operating Department Practitioners (CODP); Association for Perioperative Practice (AfPP)
Orthoptists	Orthoptist	1,485	British & Irish Orthoptic Society (BIOS)
Paramedics	Paramedic	28,617	College of Paramedics
Physiotherapists	Physical Therapist; Physiotherapist	57,796	Chartered Society of Physiotherapy
Practitioner psychologists (e.g. Clinical psychologists)	Clinical psychologist Counselling psychologist Educational psychologist Forensic psychologist Health psychologist Occupational psychologist Practitioner psychologist Registered psychologist Sport and exercise psychologist	24,478	British Psychological Society (BPS); Association of Clinical Psychologists (ACP-UK); Association of Educational Psychologists
Prosthetists and orthotists	Orthotist; Prosthetist	1,077	British Association of Prosthetists & Orthotists
Radiographers	Diagnostic Radiographer; Radiographer; Therapeutic Radiographer	36,234	The Society & College of Radiographers
Speech and language therapists	Speech and Language Therapist; Speech Therapist	16,384	Royal College of Speech and Language Therapists

All these professions have at least one designated title that is protected by law, including those shown above. Anyone using these titles must be registered with the HCPC. It is a criminal offence for someone to claim that they are registered with the HCPC when they are not, or to use a protected title that they are not entitled to use.

== Maintaining standards ==
If a professional who is registered with them does not meet the standards which are set, the HCPC can take action which might include stopping an individual from practising.

== Other UK healthcare regulators ==
The Professional Standards Authority for Health and Social Care (PSA) is an independent body accountable to the UK Parliament, which promotes the health and well-being of the public and oversees the ten UK healthcare regulators. These are:

- General Medical Council
- Nursing and Midwifery Council
- General Dental Council
- General Pharmaceutical Council
- General Optical Council
- General Chiropractic Council
- General Osteopathic Council
- Pharmaceutical Society of Northern Ireland
- Social Work England
- Health and Care Professions Council

== Controversy ==
In 2016, via a Freedom of Information request it was revealed that despite increasing registration costs for healthcare professionals, the HCPC spent over £17,000 on their Christmas party. For 224 attendees, the cost-per-head for one meal was £76.12, comparable to the yearly registration costs for many workers.

After the registration of social workers was transferred to Social Work England, the HCPC's registrants fell by approximately 100,000; the new total of 281,000 represented a fall of around 26%. Despite their workload decreasing, it was found through an FOI request in 2020 that the HCPC had not made any redundancies in their organisation and were increasing registration costs.

After the number of international applications for registration increased in 2021, the HCPC was criticised for the increasing length of time taken to process these applications. The Professional Standards Authority for Health and Social Care, which oversees the HCPC, reported that by mid-2022 the median time for the HCPC to reach a first decision on international applications was over 90 weeks. The PSA considered that this was serious, "given that the delays could seriously affect applicants and aggravate workforce shortages in the NHS".

== See also ==
- Allied health professions
- Occupational therapy in the United Kingdom
