= Scottish Social Services Council =

UK non-departmental public body

The Scottish Social Services Council
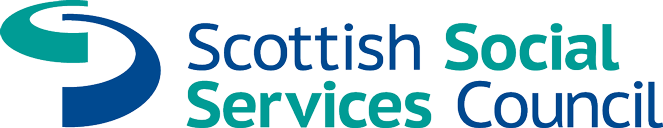

Non-departmental public body overview
- Formed: 2001
- Jurisdiction: Scotland
- Headquarters: Compass House; 11 Riverside Drive; Dundee, DD1 4NY
- Website: www.sssc.uk.com

Scottish Social Services Council (SSSC) is a non-departmental public body of the Scottish Government responsible for raising standards in the country's social work, social care, children and young people's workforce, registering people who work in social work, social care, children's and young people's services, and the regulation of education and training.

== History ==
The SSSC was established in October 2001 by the Regulation of Care (Scotland) Act.

== Functions ==
The SSSC regulates individuals who provide personal care in Scotland. It is complemented by the Care Inspectorate, which regulates the organisations responsible for providing care in Scotland.

There are more than 208,000 people working in social services in Scotland. This includes social care workers, social workers, social work students, and children and young people workers. The range of care services provided includes residential and day centres, community facilities, and home-based support.

The SSSC:

- Publishes the national codes of practice for people working in social work, social care, children's and young people's services and their employers
- Registers workers and students in social work, social care, children's and young people's services, and ensures adherence to the national codes of practice. Where people fall below the standards of practice and conduct, the SSSC can investigate and take action.
- Conducts training and education, and promotes and regulates the workforce's learning and development
- Leads workforce development and planning for this workforce in Scotland and provides national statistics.

People working in the types of services listed below, which are registered with the Care Inspectorate, must also register with the SSSC:

- Residential childcare services
- Children's daycare services
- Care home services for adults
- Housing support services
- Care at home services
- Managers of adult day care services.

The SSSC carries out the functions in Scotland of the sector skills council for people providing social work, social care and children's services in the UK, known as Skills for Care and Development. It works in partnership with employers to develop the workforce and invest in workforce planning. This includes developing National Occupational Standards (NOS), which underpin qualifications for registration and outline the skills, knowledge and understanding necessary for an effective workforce.

Skills for Care and Development is a partnership between:

- Social Care Wales
- Northern Ireland Social Care Council
- Skills for Care in England
- Scottish Social Services Council.

== Governance and oversight ==
In April 2024, BetterCareScotland called on the Scottish Parliament to address the need for independent oversight of social care regulation in Scotland by a professional body with risk management, regulatory, compliance, analytical and lay expertise to eradicate poor practices that expose women to the risk of abuse in care homes for older people in Scotland and loopholes that enable its cover-up.

== See also ==
- Social care in Scotland
