= European Care Certificate =

The European Care Certificate (ECC) is a basic certificate for the social care sector. It is awarded after passing an exam which is the same in all European countries.

== History of the ECC ==
The ECC has been developed during a project funded by the Lifelong Learning Programme in 2006. Today there are 15 European countries using and working on the further development of the ECC.

== Countries involved ==
The ECC is at the moment offered in the following countries of the European Union:

- Belgium
- Bulgaria
- Germany
- United Kingdom
- Ireland
- Italy
- Austria
- Portugal
- Romania
- Slovenia
- Czech Republic
- Hungary
- Cyprus
- Poland
- Latvia

== Content of the exam ==
The BESCLO (Basic European Social Care Learning Outcomes) covers 8 topics of the social care sector, which are:
1. The values of social care
2. Promote life quality for the individuals you support
3. Working with risk
4. Understand your role as a care worker
5. Safety at work
6. Communicating positively
7. Recognise and respond to abuse and neglect
8. Develop as a worker

== Sources ==
- www.europeancarecertificate.eu
- www.scie.org.uk
- www.easpd.eu
