= Purpose-centered education =

Purpose-centered education (PCE) is a pedagogical model developed by Audrey Cohen and her colleagues at the College for Human Services, now Metropolitan College of New York, PCE blends theory and practice in students' jobs and lives to produce graduates with a guiding vision of social justice developed during the 1970s that continues to underlie curriculum development at Metropolitan College of New York.

== Approach ==
Each semester is oriented to a specified Purpose with the courses coordinated to address specific Dimensions of that Purpose. The Dimensions include Values and Ethics, Self and Others, Systems, and Skills. Central to PCE is a Constructive Action (CA) that entails practical fieldwork involving "a sustained effort carried out in a work situation, to identify and achieve a significant initiative related to the semester's performance area." PCE was originally developed in the 1970s by a group including Audrey Cohen, Deborah Allen, Barbara Walton and Steve Sunderland.
