= Central Council of Probation and After-Care Committees =

The Central Council of Probation and After-Care Committees was the body which co-ordinated probation services (which were generally organised on a county basis) in England and Wales and acted as their central representative to the UK Government. It was one of the founder members of the Central Council for Education and Training in Social Work in 1971.

In 1978 it produced briefing papers for local Probation and After-Care Committees on the Royal Commission on Criminal Procedure (Philips Commission), and the diminished use of probation orders.

In the 1981 Birthday Honours John Patrick Marland, Chairman of the Council was made a Commander of the Order of the British Empire.

It was succeeded by the Probation Boards Association.

Its records are held in the Home Office archives.
