= Skills for Care =

Strategic workforce development and planning body for adult social care in England

- Founded: 2002
- Type: Company limited by guarantee and Registered Charity
- Registration no.: Company ref 3866683; Charity ref 1079836
- Location: Leeds
- Key people: John Coughlan CBE, Chair; Oonagh Smyth, CEO
- Employees: 203 (2021)
- Website: www.skillsforcare.org.uk

Skills for Care is the strategic workforce development and planning body for adult social care in England.

Skills for Care is an independent registered charity working with employers, government entities, and partners whose mission is to ensure social care has the right people, skills and support required to deliver the highest quality care and support.

== Role ==
Skills for Care focuses on using data and evidence to drive change in adult social care. The organisation provide best practices, tools, resources, and intelligence to support workforce recruitment, capabilities, and culture.

The organisation works with employers to gather data on the adult social care workforce through the Adult Social Care Workforce Data Set (ASC-WDS), the leading source of workforce data for the adult social care sector in England. In August 2019, ASC-WDS replaced the organisation's previous National Minimum Data Set for Social Care, NMDS-SC.

== Area networks ==
Skills for Care's local area teams work directly with adult social care providers, as well as with a wide range of other partners within the local health and care systems.

Area networks also develop partnerships with employers to help them get the best out of resources available for social care workforce development in their area. They can help employers to plan their workforce development requirements.

Registered manager and deputy manager networks cover 151 local authority areas, providing guidance, facilitating information sharing and space for peer-to-peer support.
