= Audrey Cohen =

American educator (1931–1996)

Audrey C. Cohen (May 14, 1931 – March 10, 1996) was the founding president of Metropolitan College of New York, a non-profit, private institution known for its unique curricular structure and commitment to experiential education. An educational visionary, activist, and social entrepreneur, Cohen was convinced that people learn best when they approach their learning with an immediate, concrete purpose directed at improving the world. The college she founded continues today to provide students with a "Purpose-Centered" education that enables them to work towards a degree while developing their skills as counselors, business managers, teachers, community organizers, and human service providers.

== Early life ==
Audrey Cohen was born in Pittsburgh, Pennsylvania and attended Taylor Allderdice High School. Diminutive in stature, smart, and energetic, she went on to the University of Pittsburgh where she majored in Political Science and Education. During her summers off from college she did volunteer work in Washington with the Young Women's Christian Association (YWCA), the Congress of Racial Equality (CORE) and the American Friends Service Committee (AFSC) – experiences that she later said raised her awareness of social injustice and nurtured her commitment to civic activism.

Cohen graduated from college magna cum laude in 1953 and spent the next three years in Japan and Morocco with her husband, Mark Cohen, who was at the time an intelligence officer with the U.S. Navy. The young couple then returned to Washington, D.C. and began raising a family. In 1958 a desire to stay active in the workplace while still caring for her two young daughters prompted Audrey Cohen and another mother to launch Part-Time Research Associates (PTRA), an organization that enabled well-educated married women to work on specific part-time research projects contracted by businesses or government agencies.

When Audrey Cohen and her husband moved to New York City, her outreach work for Part-Time Research Associates expanded, and soon the organization was making a profit. But by early 1964 Cohen began to sense that her focus on finding part-time jobs for well-educated women was insufficient. Michael Harrington's exposé of The Other America, Martin Luther King Jr.'s "I Have a Dream" speech, and President Lyndon B. Johnson's announcement of a War on Poverty in his January 1964 inaugural address contributed to a new social consciousness, and Cohen was eager to become part of the era's efforts to create more just and equitable cities. She and a small group of friends began to organize the Women's Talent Corps (WTC), an organization that would focus on jobs for low -income women who had been left behind in America's post-war economic boom.

== The Women's Talent Corps ==
For two and a half years Cohen and her associates worked to build support for the new venture. Their aim was to develop an educational institution that would help create above-entry-level jobs in schools, health-care centers, and human service agencies and at the same time provide training for those jobs. Cohen herself engaged in intensive community outreach, visiting low-income neighborhoods in Harlem, Bedford Stuyvesant, and the South Bronx. Making the trips alone and often at night, Cohen spoke to groups of women in their homes, churches, or nearby school auditoriums. She asked them about the kinds of jobs they themselves could imagine doing that would improve the services in their communities, and then she used this information to push city schools and agencies to open new lines of employment. When the funding for her organization was eventually secured, these women became part of the WTC's first student cohort.

At first Cohen's project was met with resistance from many of New York City's social service bureaucracies, especially since it was specifically aimed at and directed by women. But with the passage of the federal Economic Opportunity Act of 1964 and the establishment of the Office of Economic Opportunity (OEO), Cohen saw an opening for support. In July, 1966, her fledgling organization received a Community Action Program grant from the OEO that enabled her to begin accepting students and training them for what are now termed "paraprofessional" jobs in schools, hospitals, and human service agencies throughout the city.

== The College for Human Services ==
By 1969 the Women's Talent Corps had grown and was successfully improving the employment opportunities of hundreds of inner-city women, many of whom had previously been on public assistance. But Cohen soon saw opportunities for further growth. Building on the Corps Women's own requests for more formal training and wanting also to admit men, Cohen changed the organization's name to the College for Human Services. In 1970, after an arduous struggle, the College succeeded in gaining the authority from the Board of Regents of New York State to grant the Associate degree.

From the outset, the College for Human Services was unique. Federal funding required that the College could accept applicants only from families with incomes of less than $3,600, and students were paid a stipend for their fieldwork. The curriculum required that students spent three days in the field assisting at city schools and human service agencies and two full days in the College's classrooms at 201 Varick Street in Lower Manhattan.

As a New York Times article pointed out at the time, the academic courses and the human service work were "coordinated." Students' work in the field was informed by their study of social theoreticians such as Erik Erikson, B.F. Skinner, and Marshall McLuhan; in turn students could bring their first-hand knowledge of practices in the field to their reading of social theory. Most faculty members had experience in education, social work, or community organizing and were responsible for classroom instruction and field guidance.

By mid-1970 the college was suffering growing pains, and both faculty members and students were complaining about their workload. External rumblings from the student movement and the black power movement were echoed at College meetings and workshops. When an African-American member of the administration was fired for mismanagement of funds in August 1970, the College for Human Services became one of 450 campuses to go on strike that year. After nearly three weeks of picketing on the street in front of the building, a group of about 20 students and faculty members took over Audrey Cohen's office, demanding that she be replaced by a person of color. Cohen stayed calm during the episode, even when, according to a New York Times article reporting on the event, one student called her a "blue-eyed devil."

At a meeting with the faculty and students the next day, the administration agreed to some of the protesters' demands, including their demands for more transparency in the administration's operations, and classes resumed. For the next two years, however, the inadequacies of the two-year program became more apparent. Cohen saw that with the increasing professionalization of the city's social service agencies, the College needed to become a fully accredited four-year institution.

Again taking a bold and controversial step, Cohen proceeded with the support of her Board of Trustees to dismiss most of the faculty, close down all but the few classes that were needed by the second-year students to graduate, and set up a small task force to engage in a restructuring process that would last for nearly a year. The task force included graduates from Princeton and Harvard, well-known community activists such as Ruth Messinger (who later ran for Mayor of New York), and a project dean from the National Training Laboratories who had a background in curriculum design.

After months of meetings, the group came up with a unique curricular grid that has remained the model for all subsequent programs at the College. The curricular grid or matrix consisted of eight semesters, each of which focused on a specific "competency" crucial to human service practitioners. The sequence of competencies (later termed "Purposes") was intersected by the rows of five multidisciplinary "Dimensions" common to each semester's learning. To provide both coherence and a means of assessing field performance each semester, the model also included what Cohen called a "Constructive Action," a project undertaken in the field that relates to that semester's purpose and which, when documented, includes reference to the academic learning covered in all five dimension courses.

The originality of the college's curricular model soon attracted the attention of educators nationwide. In 1976 the matrix was adapted by Lincoln University in Pennsylvania, where it remains today as the conceptual framework for a Masters in Human Services program. In the late 1970s the College for Human Service was the focus of an in-depth study by Gerald Grant and David Riesman that was published in Perpetual Dream: Reform and Experiment in the American College and in On Competence: A Critical Analysis of Competency-Based Reforms in Higher Education.

By 1979, the CHS had become a tuition-charging institution and was offering bachelor's degrees in the human services. In 1983, CHS initiated a business degree program, and in 1988 it began offering a master's program in public administration. Also in 1983, the college's Purpose-Centered model began to be adapted for elementary and secondary education in several schools around the country. In 1992 the College was renamed Audrey Cohen College after its founder.

== Audrey Cohen College ==
Up until her death in 1996, Cohen actively promoted the college's visibility and expansion. As a college president she gave numerous speeches at venues ranging from Tufts University, Ramapo College, Bryn Mawr, the University of Iowa, Newport College and UCLA, to the U.S. House of Representatives. She was also a member of a number of professional organizations, including the American Association of Higher Education, the National Vocational Guidance Association, and the National Organization for Women, and she was a member of numerous Boards of Directors. In her later life she became an alumna of the President/Owner Management Program at the Harvard Graduate School of Business Administration.

Cohen's written output included 11 articles or chapters authored or co-authored during the college's early years. Perhaps the best known of these was "The Citizen as the Integrating Agent: Productivity in the Human Services" that was published in the Human Service Monograph Series and continues to be assigned in courses at the College today. Another important article was entitled "Human Service" and appeared as Chapter 27 in Arthur W. Chickering's The Modern American College: Responding to the New Realities of Diverse Students and a Changing Society.

In recognition of her educational work Cohen received numerous honors and awards. She was the only woman invited to serve on the Newman Committee that was funded by the Ford Foundation and sponsored by the U.S. Department of Health, Education, and Welfare to study the problems of higher education in the early 1970s. Awards over the years included the Mina Shaughnessy Scholarship Award from the United States Office of Education, the Outstanding Leadership in Higher Education Award from the Committee of Independent Colleges and Universities, the President's Award from the National Organization of Human Service Educators, and a doctorate of humane letters from the University of New England.

By the mid-1990s Audrey Cohen College had moved into new space at the corner of Varick and Canal Streets, was being advertised in subway stations and on TV, and had grown to over 1,000 students. But by then it also became clear that Cohen's health was in decline. She was diagnosed with ovarian cancer, and despite chemotherapy treatments and transfusions, she died in March, 1996. "Ms. Cohen was a powerhouse of energy when scorning the rigidity and failures of the contemporary educational system and proposing how to reform it," the New York Times obituary stated. Cohen had two daughters, Winifred Alisa Cohen and Dawn Jennifer Cohen Margolin, by her first marriage, to Mark Cohen. She was survived by them and her second husband, Dr. Ralph Wharton, a psychiatrist in private practice in New York City.

== Legacy ==
Cohen's close associate Alida Mesrop succeeded her as College president starting in the mid-1990s, and Mesrop provided strong leadership as the College continued to grow. In 1999, Stephen A. Greenwald was appointed president, and in 2002 the name of the College was changed to Metropolitan College of New York (MCNY) . In 2008 Dr. Vinton Thompson became its president.

Today MCNY includes undergraduate and graduate programs in human services, business, urban studies, and education. Together the programs graduate over 400 students a year, most of whom are adult women of color and recent immigrants, many of whom are the first in their families to graduate from college. Among the College's several recent achievements are the accreditation of its masters in education program by the National Council for Accreditation of Teacher Education (NCATE), accreditation of its business programs by the Accreditation Council for Business Schools and Programs (ACBSP), and recognition for the College's contributions to "community service" by President Obama's Higher Education Honor Roll.

Before her death Ms. Cohen had intended to write a book about her educational aims that would be entitled To Build a Better World. Although she did not live long enough to complete that book, the aim of improving the world through constructive actions in community settings remains an ongoing curricular goal at the college that she founded.

== Audrey Cohen's writings ==
- A new educational paradigm (an article from the Phi Delta Kappan dated June 1, 1993)
- Predictors of public or private employment for business college graduates (an article from Public Personnel Management dated March 22, 1993)
- Women and Higher Education: Recommendations for Change (Eric reports; 1971)
- The citizen as the integrating agent: Productivity in the Human Services (from the Human Services monograph series; 1978)
- The founding of a new profession: the Human Service Professional (1974)
- Citizen Empowerment Guide (1977)
