= Harold Lawrence McPheeters =

American psychiatrist (1923–2021)

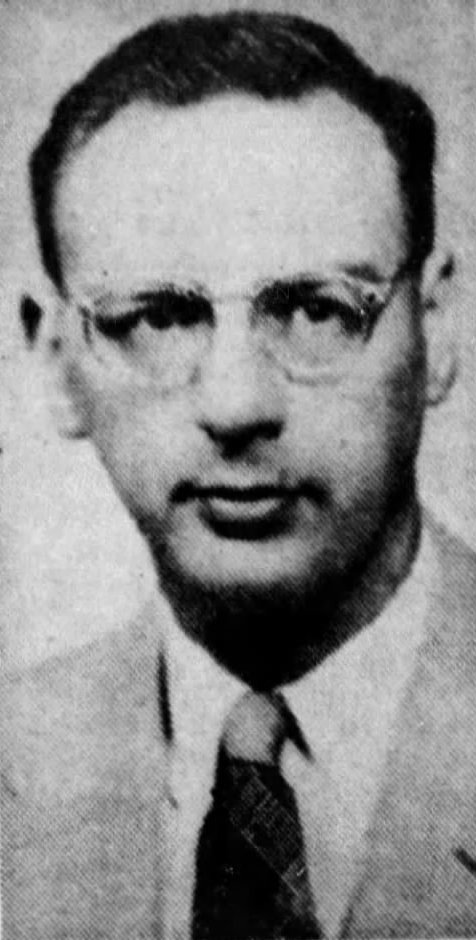
McPheeters in 1960

Harold Lawrence McPheeters (March 10, 1923 – January 14, 2021) was an American psychiatrist and a key figure in human services, called "the father of Human Services." He served as the commissioner of the Kentucky Department of Mental Health from 1957 to 1964.

== Biography ==
McPheeters was born in March 1923. He attended the University of Louisville and graduated in 1948. He was appointed the assistant commissioner of the Kentucky Department of Mental Health from 1955 to 1957. He served as the commissioner of the Kentucky Department of Mental Health from 1957 to 1964. In 1963 he was appointed the associate director for mental health for the Southern Regional Education Board. From 1964 to 1965 he was the deputy commissioner for the New York State Department of Mental Hygiene. McPheeters died in January 2021, at the age of 97.
