= Social care in Wales =

Social care in Wales encompasses social work; care home services in the community for adults, children and young people; and services for young children, including nurseries and after-school care clubs. The legal foundation is now the Social Services and Wellbeing (Wales) Act 2014.

Planning and commissioning social care is the responsibility of the 22 local authorities of Wales. They have some flexibility about what domiciliary care services are charged for. People in residential care who have capital of more than £50,000 are expected to meet the full costs of their care until their capital falls below the threshold.

In 2014, about 1.5% of the population aged between 18 and 64 received services, and about 14% of those over 65.

During the COVID-19 pandemic in Wales 40% of Welsh residents who may have needed social care were unable to access it. Some were “afraid of catching Covid” or didn't want to add extra burden on stretched social care services but other reasons included a lack of availability or staff shortages; being deemed ineligible or otherwise not being offered care and the application or access processes being too complex.

86% of respondents to a survey carried out by Swansea University early in 2022 felt that the social care system in Wales was in need of reform and that this should be a high priority. Most agreed that social care staff should have comparable pay, working conditions and career progression opportunities relative to equivalent career stage NHS staff.

More than 1200 organisations provide social care services within Wales, with a 2025 study finding that every £1 spent on social care, lead to a £2.78 worth of socioeconomic benefit.

== Workforce ==
In 2025 around 85,000 people in Wales were employed by social care providers, on an average salary of £24,124 a year. Women make up 82% of this workforce. Around 57% of workers reported being satisfied with their job in 2025, with 26% planning to leave within a year.

=== Unpaid Carers ===
Between 310,000 and 480,000 people in Wales are believed to be unpaid carers. The majority of unpaid carers in Wales do not claim Carer's Allowance, with only 57,000 carers receiving the benefit in 2025.

== See also ==
- Social care in the United Kingdom
- Social care in England
- Social care in Scotland
