= Care Act 2014 =

Act of the Parliament of the United Kingdom

Care Act 2014 (Note: Section 129.)
- Act of Parliament
- Parliament of the United Kingdom
- Long title: An Act to make provision to reform the law relating to care and support for adults and the law relating to support for carers; to make provision about safeguarding adults from abuse or neglect; to make provision about care standards; to establish and make provision about Health Education England; to establish and make provision about the Health Research Authority; to make provision about integrating care and support with health services; and for connected purposes
- Citation: 2014 c. 23
- Introduced by: Jeremy Hunt MP, Secretary of State for Health (Commons); Frederick Curzon, 7th Earl Howe; 9 May 2013 (Lords)
- Territorial extent: England and Wales; Scotland (in part); Northern Ireland (in part); (Note: Section 128.)

Dates
- Royal assent: 14 May 2014
- Commencement: 7 July 2014, 15 July 2014 and 1 October 2014 (Note: Section 127.)
Other legislation
Amends	House of Commons Disqualification Act 1975; National Health Service Act 2006

Status: Amended

History of passage through Parliament

Text of statute as originally enacted

Revised text of statute as amended

The Care Act 2014 (c. 23) is an act of the Parliament of the United Kingdom that received royal assent on 14 May 2014, after being introduced on 9 May 2013. The main purpose of the act was to overhaul the existing 60-year-old legislation regarding social care in England. The Care Act 2014 sets out in one place, local authorities’ duties in relation to assessing people's needs and their eligibility for publicly funded care and support.

The Act received the consensus of the three main political parties in the UK during its passage through parliament. The Act was implemented following substantial public consultation but was criticised for some of the funding reforms included within the Act.

The Act was unusual in respect of being one of the few Acts to have started its progress in the House of Lords rather than the House of Commons.

== Overview of contents ==
The Care Act is a lengthy act (129 clauses in the main part of the Act) addressing many issues: from a review of the public consultation 107 recommendations were made of which many were adopted. However some of the major changes were:

- local councils now have a duty to promote the well-being of carers; previously their duty of care only related to the users of the care services;
- anyone receiving care and support from a regulated provider which has been arranged by the council will be covered by the Human Rights Act 1998;
- local councils must enable users or potential users of care services to access independent financial advice on their care funding;
- a new appeals system was introduced for care users to appeal against council decisions on eligibility to care and care funding;
- guidance on safeguarding vulnerable adults, which in England had taken the form of the 2000 No Secrets guidance, was replaced by statutory guidance issued under the legislation.
- Health Education England became a non-departmental public body (NDPB) on 1 April 2015 under the provisions of the act.

== Financial assessment ==
Regulations made under the Care Act 2014 specify that a permanent resident of a care home is not eligible for local authority financial assistance if they have capital exceeding £23,250 in value. This limit still applies in 2019.

== Cap on care costs ==
Sections 15 and 16 (not yet implemented) specify that local authorities may not charge more in total for meeting eligible care needs than a specified amount which is to be reviewed annually. Once the cap is reached, any further social care needed by the individual is to be provided free of charge. The cap on care costs was due to be in effect from April 2016, but this was delayed to April 2020, by an announcement by Alistair Burt, the Minister of State for Care and Support, on 17 July 2015. The introduction of the cap had been passed into law as part of the Care Act 2014 during the Coalition government, and implementation of this part of the law from 2016 onwards had been accepted by all main political parties during the general election of 2015.

== Changes introduced as a result of COVID-19 ==
During the COVID-19 pandemic, emergency legislation was introduced by the government known as the Adult Social Care Action Plan. It has four main goals which aimed to reduce the impact of COVID-19 on the adult social care sector. Section 4.6 and 4.7 of the Adult Social Care Action Plan states how the Coronavirus Act 2020 amended the Care Act 2014 by creating "Care Act easements". This meant that in cases of necessity, the legal duties outlined in the Care Act 2014 did not have to be fulfilled during the pandemic. Mencap, a leading charity supporting people with learning disabilities found that 69% of people with learning disabilities who participated in their survey had their care reduced or removed altogether. Through overruling the agreed outcomes of individuals' agreed care plans thousands of disabled people were going without their care as a direct result to policy changes.

The changes to the Care Act expired on 16 July 2021 and are no longer in force.
