= Metropolitan College of New York =

Private college in New York City, New York

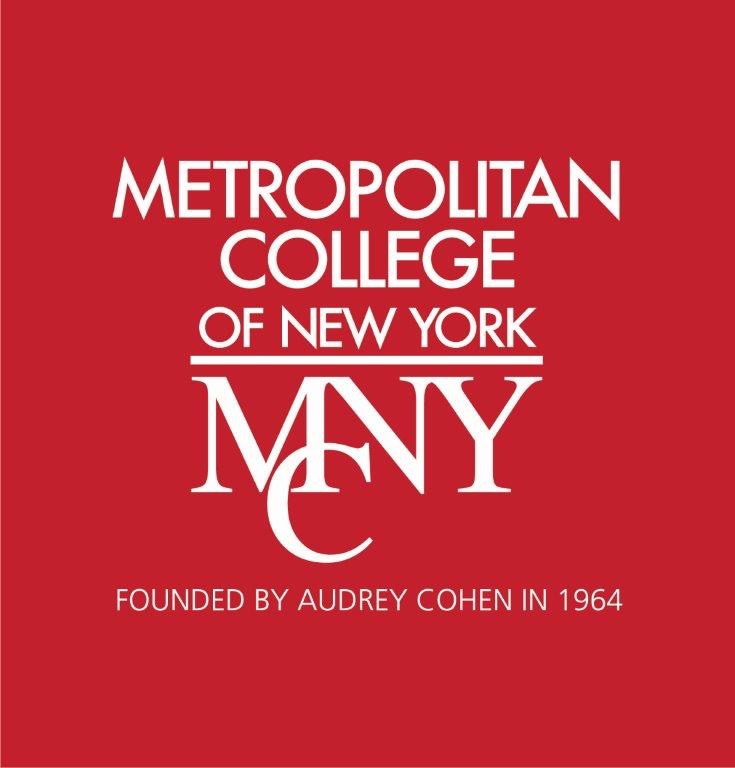
- Former names: Audrey Cohen College (1992–2002), College for Human Services (1970–1992)
- Type: Private college
- Established: 1964
- Endowment: $0.8 million as of January 31, 2022
- Chairman: Gary P. Jenkins
- President: Charles J. Gibbs
- Academic staff: 19 FT/ 105 PT (2023)
- Students: 663 (2023)
- Postgraduates: 233 (2023)
- Location: Bronx, New York City, New York, United States
- Campus: Urban
- Colors: Red and White
- Website: www.mcny.edu

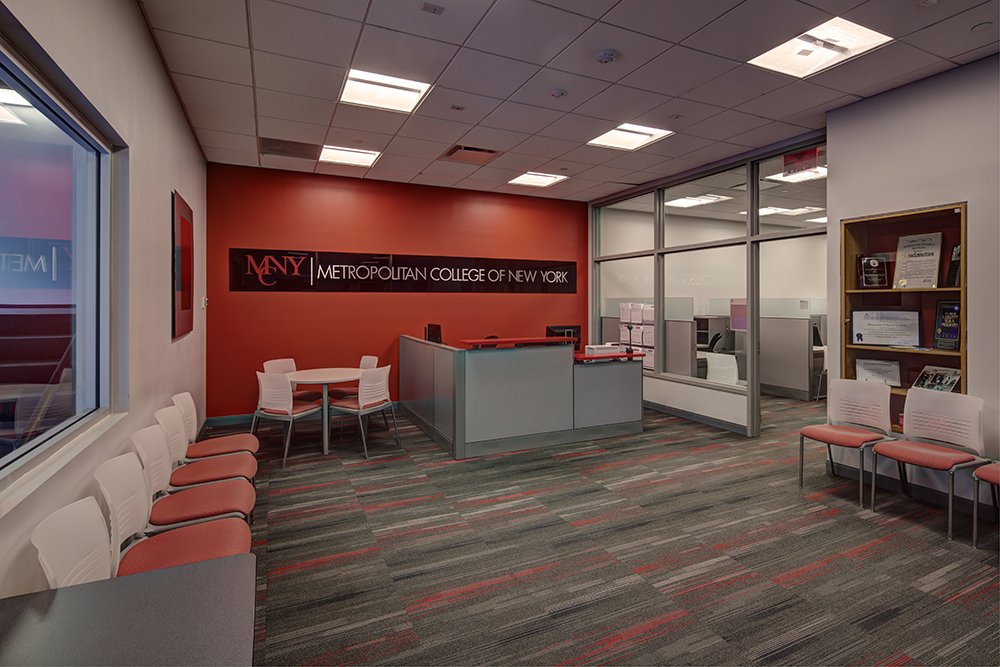
Current location in the Bronx

Metropolitan College of New York (MCNY), formerly Audrey Cohen College, is a private college in the Bronx borough of New York City. MCNY is accredited by the Middle States Commission on Higher Education and consists of three schools: The Audrey Cohen School for Human Services and Education, the School for Public Affairs and Administration, and the School for Business.

== History ==
The college was founded in 1964 by educational pioneer Audrey Cohen as the Women's Talent Corp. It was renamed the College for Human Services in 1970, when it was granted a charter by the New York State Board of Regents. In 1983, it started offering business programs and in 1988, it added its first graduate program: a Master of Administration, which today is awarded as a Master of Public Administration. In 1992, the college was renamed Audrey Cohen College in honor of its founder. It gained its current name, the Metropolitan College of New York, in 2002.

In 2012, the associates and bachelor's degree in Business Administration and all MBA programs were accredited by the Accreditation Council for Business Schools and Programs.

== Academics ==
The highest degrees offered are master's degrees. The college follows founder Audrey Cohen's Purpose-Centered Education philosophy. In contrast to colleges and universities that organize the school year according to semesters, MCNY refers to each term as a "purpose". Each term's purpose, or unifying theme, drives the coursework for the term, which includes a Constructive Action (CA). The Purpose determines the focus for the Constructive Action that students are required to plan, implement, and evaluate. That Action must relate to the semester’s Purpose and improve the lives of individuals and institutions outside the classroom. CAs are unique student projects that combine classroom study with research-fieldwork projects that integrate lessons learned in all of the term's courses with hands-on experience.

== Campus ==
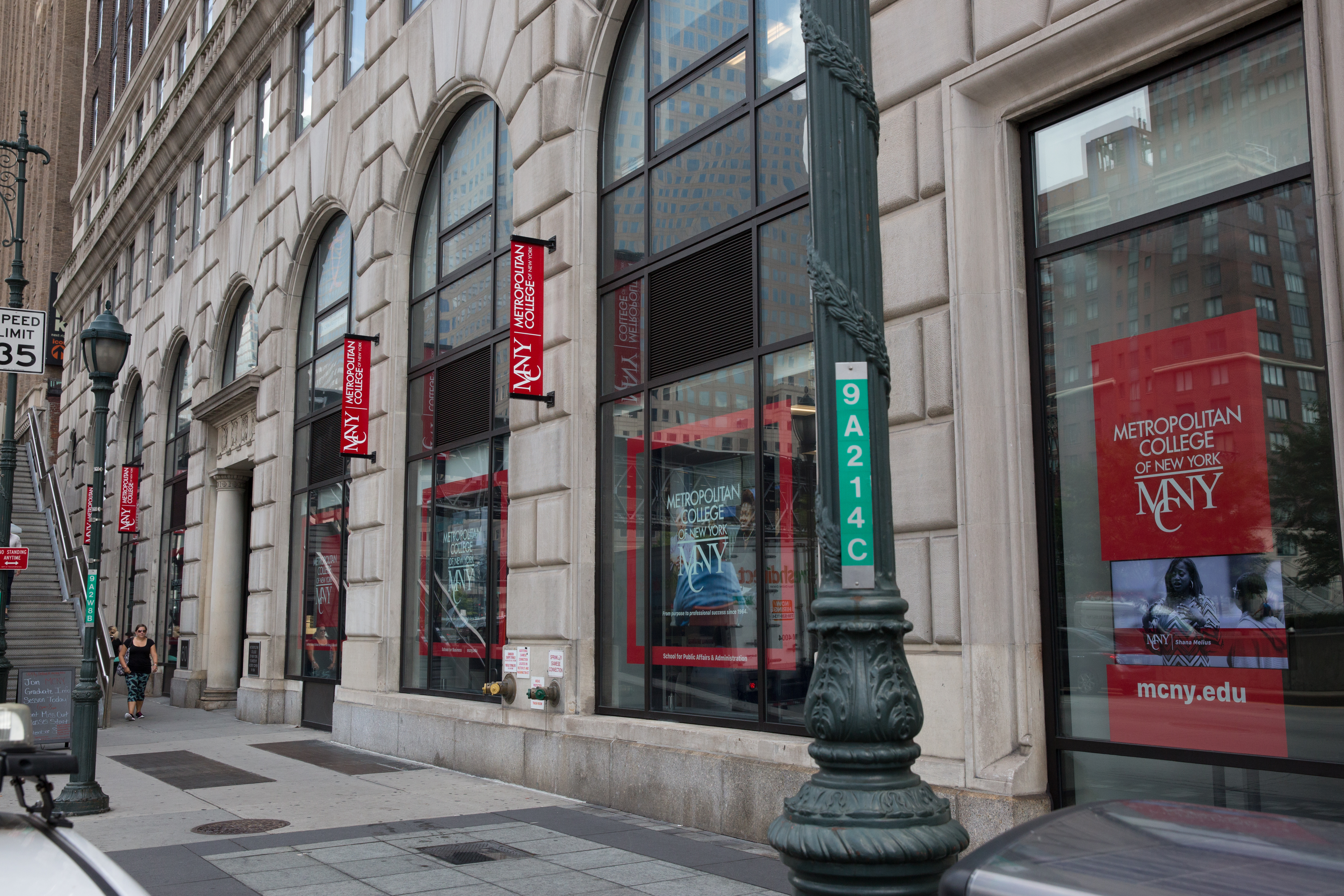
Former location at 40 Rector Street and 60 West Street in Manhattan.

In 2012, MCNY reopened a presence in the Bronx, with its Bronx Extension Center, located at 529 Courtlandt Avenue.

In 2016, the college moved to a new Bronx campus at 463 East 149th Street, which is its sole location and headquarters as of 2026. The Bronx campus is a 26,000 square foot, part of a building, and has the capacity to serve approximately 500 students.

=== Former locations ===
Before 2016, the college rented space on Canal Street in Manhattan. In 2016, MCNY purchased three floors of the commercial condominium at 40 Rector Street in Manhattan, with 110,000 square feet of space and an entrance at 60 West Street. MCNY purchased part of the first and the sixth, seventh and eighth floors of the 19-story building with a $68 million loan. In January 2026, Metropolitan College of New York sold its space at 40 Rector Street to the City University of New York.
