= Social care in England =

In England, social care is defined as the provision of social work, personal care, protection or social support services to children or adults in need or at risk, or adults with needs arising from illness, disability, old age or poverty. The main legal definitions flow from the National Health Service and Community Care Act 1990, with other provisions covering disability and responsibilities to informal carers. That provision may have one or more of the following aims: to protect people who use care services from abuse or neglect, to prevent deterioration of or promote physical or mental health, to promote independence and social inclusion, to improve opportunities and life chances, to strengthen families and to protect human rights in relation to people's social needs.

Since the 1990s, local commissioners (mainly based in councils) oversee a market with many different types of social care provision available, either purchased by public bodies after assessments or accessed on a self funded basis by the public. These include community support and activities, advisory services and advocacy, provision of equipment to manage disabilities, alarm systems, e.g., to manage the outcome of falls, home/domiciliary care or daycare, housing options with levels of care support attached, residential nursing home care, as well as support for informal carers.

Social care is frequently used as a synonymous term with social welfare, and as an alternative to social work. The term often implies informal networks of support and assistance as well as services funded following assessments by social work and other professions.

Social care in the modern context encompasses many areas of need, each with a level of specialist services. These can be broadly categorised as follows:

- Adults – this includes support for older people, people with mental health problems, learning or physical disabilities, those with alcohol and substance misuse problems, prevention of abuse or neglect, needs related to homelessness, domestic abuse and associated support for families and carers. Due to a range of legislation, benefit entitlement, history and supply of services, adults over the age of 65 are routinely assessed as requiring a lower "personal budget" and less favourable care than younger people with similar needs and/or disabilities. This is considered ageism.
- Children, young people and families – this includes preventative family support and child protection services, child placement, fostering, adoption, working with young offenders, children and young people who have learning or physical disabilities, or who are homeless, as well as support for families and carers.
- Workforce – this includes the provision of resources, training and support for those working in social care.

Social care is in the jurisdiction of the Minister of State for Social Care in the Department of Health and Social Care.

== History ==
Social care has long existed as an informal concept, through family and community support and charitable works. In medieval times, social care had been provided by monastic foundations, but at the Reformation, that support ended when the monasteries were dissolved. The loss of monastic social support (and education) was one of the declared grievances behind the Pilgrimage of Grace.

After briefly experimenting with harsher approaches to the destitute, the Tudor establishment passed the Poor Relief Act 1601, which made civil parishes (a local government unit) responsible for providing basic health, domestic care, housing, and employment support, to those in need; this was one of the earliest acts of Parliament to offer statutory support. The "care" to be provided could include payments, food, apprenticeships, boarding or referral to a workhouse.

Originally the workhouse was simply a labour exchange for small pieces of low value work, which were usually carried out in-situ. In the late 18th century, a generous system of income support – the Speenhamland system – was established on an ad-hoc basis in parts of the country, and promoted by the Tory Prime Minister William Pitt the Younger. Others thought it was too generous, and were worried that it would lead to people not bothering to work. As a result, the Whigs passed the Poor Law Reform Act, which turned workhouses into harsh, almost prison-like, environments; it is these reformed workhouses which lead to the notoriety of the workhouse concept.

Under the Poor Law Reform Act, civil parishes were encouraged to form Poor Law Unions with other nearby civil parishes, and establish a joint workhouse, which were to require to operate in a manner that was so harsh and basic that people would only resort to workhouses if they were absolutely destitute and had no other option. The workhouse would provide shelter, meals, and basic social care, in return for unpleasant, harsh, and menial work; only those who were so frail that work was impossible were to be excused. All support outside the workhouse was to be abolished.

Meanwhile, the rise of industrialisation, lead to a rapidly more urbanized population, causing great social deprivation. It also bought a decline in the support provided by family and close-knit communities as people became more mobile and moved to different areas for work. However, the increasingly wealthy middle classes, now having enough time and money to engage in leisurely pursuits, established voluntary organisations which sought to alleviate these difficulties, providing rudimentary social work, and medical services. Mutually owned societies also developed, providing medical support to their members, when needed, in return for insurance-like subscriptions; some of these Industrial and Provident Societies later merged to become national not-for-profit health organisations, such as BUPA, which survives into the 21st century.

Many workhouses established infirmary sections to house frail inmates. Under the Tory government of the late 1860s, the Metropolitan Poor Act transferred responsibility for the frail poor from Poor Law Unions, in the Metropolis (the urban area around London), to a new Metropolitan Asylums Board. The Act also combined the funding of the Poor Law Unions into a shared Common Poor Fund. The Metropolitan Asylums Board established new asylums to house and treat the frail poor, and was empowered by the Metropolitan Poor Act to charge the cost of medical treatment to the Common Poor Fund. Outside the Metropolis, many Poor Law Unions moved support for the frail to new locations, away from provision for the able-bodied poor.

In the early 20th century, responsibility for social protection was gradually transferred away from workhouses, and a distinct separation grew between policies to support income maintenance and those to support frailty. In 1906, the descendants of the Whigs, the Liberal party, came to power, and reversed their earlier opposition to Speenhamland-like systems, by bringing into force the first means-tested pension for people aged 70 and over; the able-bodied elderly no longer required the workhouse. In 1929, as one of his last acts in office, the Tory prime minister Stanley Baldwin passed the Local Government Act, enabling – but not compelling – local councils to take over responsibility for frail people who lived within their area. In the early 1930s, the Unemployment Assistance Board was established to provide income support to the unemployed, removing the able-bodied from workhouses.

Local councils had been introduced in the later 19th century as a governmental unit large enough to take over from the boards which ran the many public services which had been introduced during that century. Most of them were not keen on taking over responsibility for medical services for the poor, but many were willing to take over from infirmaries and asylums that focused on simply providing social care, and often re-labelled them as care homes. The development of social sciences such as psychology and sociology bought social structures under further scrutiny, and opened the way for social work to become an area of academic study, creating a professional role.

Since wounded military staff were treated by medical officers within the military, the use of mass-conscription in World War II had meant that a much larger portion of the population had state organised medical services available to them. With an eye on future expectations of the public, Churchill commissioned the Beveridge Report into the future of welfare and health services. Once the war had ended, all the main parties promised to act on the Report's recommendations and made manifesto promises to establish a national health service; in the later 1940s the NHS was directly created as a result, absorbing the medically focused asylums and infirmaries (many of which had been renamed hospitals by this point). The workhouse concept was formally abolished.

In December 1965, the Labour government created the Committee on Local Authority Personal Social Services, chaired by Frederic Seebohm, Baron Seebohm. Amongst other things, the Seebohm Report (published 1968) recommended the establishment of a unified social service within each major local authority.

=== Care Act 2014 ===
In an effort to reform the 60-year-old legislation regarding social care in England, the Care Act 2014 received royal assent after being introduced on 9 May 2013. The act details the local authorities' duties in relation to assessing the needs and eligibility of people for publicly funded care.

Under the act, local authorities are required to:

- Assess people's needs for care and support, using a new national minimum threshold to judge eligibility
- Involve the person in the assessment, and a carer or nominee where appropriate
- Consider services besides public care that reach the same outcomes, e.g., preventative services or community support
- Provide assessment, care and support for the needs of carers, even if the person they care for does not receive local authority services.

Eligibility for adult social care, under the Care Act 2014, depends upon an individual's finances. If the financial resources of someone who is a permanent resident exceeds £23,250, the local authority is not permitted to pay towards the cost of provision of accommodation in a care home. For adults whose need for care and support other than permanent residence exceeds £23,250, the local authority may (but is not required to) pay towards the cost of care.

The Care Act 2014 also saw the implementation of a funding cost cap, the maximum contribution that an individual may need to make towards their care costs over their lifetime. Once the cap had been reached, any further social care would be provided free of charge. This was due to be in effect from April 2016 but was delayed to April 2020.

In September 2021, under the Conservative government, Boris Johnson announced plans for reform in adult social care, starting with the funding cost cap increasing to £86,000 from October 2023. Under the new cap, the upper capital limit (the point at which people are eligible to receive financial support from their local authority) rose to £100,000, from the previous £23,250. The lower capital limit (the threshold below which an individual will not have to pay anything for their care) rose to £20,000, from the previous £14,250. The new cap does not cover daily living costs for people in care homes.

Assets	Care costs paid by the individual
Above the Upper Capital Limit (£100,000)	Full cost – self funded
Between Capital Limits	What is affordable from income plus a means-tested "tariff" contribution from assets. The tariff is calculated as follows: for every £250 of capital between the lower and upper limit, an income of £1 a week is assumed, and this is payable towards the cost of care.
Below the Lower Capital Limit (£20,000)	No contribution from assets, only what is affordable from income

== Funding ==
The Institute for Public Policy Research and Age UK both maintain that social care elderly people receive should be free for those who need it. The need for social care for older and disabled adults is rising due to an ageing population and increased numbers of disabled adults. Caroline Abrahams of Age UK said, "The problems facing social care are national, but for too long successive governments have left local councils to carry the can. That's been grossly unfair to local communities and above all to older and disabled people, more than 1.5 million of whom now have some unmet need for care. This is such a big problem now that to have credibility at this election every political party that aspires to govern needs to bring forward a policy to fix care, once and for all."

=== Current provision ===
The provision of social care by local councils was not changed at the creation of the NHS. As a consequence, council provision continued to be limited to the poor. One of the first acts of the Conservative Prime Minister Ted Heath was to pass the 1970 National Insurance Act, introducing Attendance Allowance as a universal welfare payment for those needing social care.

The majority of those assessed as requiring adult social care in England are financially assessed and then expected to pay towards it, although Attendance Allowance, and its equivalents in other age groups (components of Disability Living Allowance, and Personal Independence Payments), assume income from some savings. However, for complex care needs, and residential care, this is often not enough money to fully cover the cost. Financial assistance is available from local councils to cover the remainder of costs up to an amount expected to meet needs, but it remains means-tested, and is thus targeted at those whose assets and income are not sufficient to pay for their care. Some local authorities have schemes which enable care costs to be postponed, though evidence in 2011 suggested this was not available from all local authorities.

Sir Andrew Dilnot conducted a review of the social care system for the Cameron Government, and his 2011 report proposed a universal lifetime cost cap of around £73,000, on the basis of pooled risk, like an insurance arrangement. He also proposed the introduction of personal budgets for every care user, allowing them to spend the funding for their social care as they saw fit, rather than having to use the council provider. These changes were legislated for, and passed into law, but local councils demanded that the changes be delayed until after the next election, saying they did not have the money or ability to implement the changes immediately; the change was postponed until 2020, and has not yet been commenced.

Independently of the Dilnot proposals, the administration of Attendance Allowance was transferred to Local Councils in 2020, meaning that assessment of care needs merged with assessment of funding eligibility, for those who qualify for Attendance Allowance (individuals who have reached State Pension age). This will also allow the money to pass directly from central government to the council, without needing to pass through the care user's bank account; personal budgets mean that the care user still has control of how the money is spent, though it will no longer be possible to spend it on frivolous things that do not contribute towards care.

A 2017 employment tribunal decision meant many care workers are entitled to back pay for overnight sleep shifts. Many local authorities, charities and companies providing care say they could not afford this and would fold without financial help from the government. In 2024, the issue remained unresolved with some care providers facing possible bankruptcy.

A director general for adult social care, Rosamund Roughton, was appointed to the Department of Health and Social Care in 2020, a similar position having been abolished in 2016 when Jon Rouse left.

=== Systemic funding problems ===
The rapid improvements in population health that the NHS brought about caused a significant increase in life expectancy, but in turn, this caused social care to be required for longer. By the end of the 20th century – compounded by the retirement of the post-war baby boom generation – the ageing UK population, combined with increasing costs, led to the NHS finding it difficult to fully fund healthcare, with a corresponding impact on the cost of social care. In 2015, Martin McKee of the London School of Hygiene and Tropical Medicine said that "since 2009, ... the number of people aged 85 years and over has increased by 9%. To maintain current levels of social care would require an extra £1.1 billion ...".

In 2017, the Local Government Association estimated a £2.6bn funding shortfall by 2020 and feared some councils could be challenged in the High Court for not providing a statutory minimum standard of care; they blamed historic under-funding and increasing numbers of old people. The Centre for Workforce Intelligence estimated that two million or more extra carers would be needed by 2025 in England alone, for both in-home care and care homes, due to growing demand.

Although council tax rose substantially since 1997, under the Blair ministry, subsequent restrictions imposed by the Cameron Ministry saw it erode back towards 1997 levels. The 2017 budget gave councils access to an extra £1 billion provided centrally. However, Nigel Edwards of the Nuffield Trust think tank said that this would cover only half the £2bn funding shortfall feared in 2017–18. The Housing, Communities and Local Government Committee of the House of Commons reported in August 2019 that the social care system was on the "verge of collapse", with "an opaque source of revenue, partially funded by tax systems that don't spread the burden equally." The Centre for Health and the Public Interest cautioned that a large increase in public funds for the sector could just produce bigger profits for privatised operators, since many firms lack financial transparency. In 2022 the Association of Directors of Adult Social Services calculated that though the hours of home care delivered had increased to 41 million by October 2021, over half a million people were waiting for care and support.

These systemic problems have led to an increase in the number of unpaid carers, with around one in five adults performing this role in 2022. The lack of adequate funding for the care sector has led to a growing 'social care gap' which was projected in 2015 to rise until 2032.

In 2026 more than £3 billion was spent each year on placements for children, an average of £384,020 per child per year, 84% with private providers, and often far from the children's families. A study found that Lancashire had 17 times more local children needing care than children's places, while four London boroughs have no children's care places because housing there is expensive. At that time, 80,000 children were in local authority care in England.

=== Long term solutions ===
The Local Government Association said in 2017 "It cannot be left to council taxpayers alone to try and fix this crisis. In 2021, Conservative MP Sarah Wollaston said "rising unmet need for social care will not be resolved without genuine cross-party working to find a long-term solution to funding".

A 2017 poll found that 57% of Britons were willing to pay more tax to fund social care. Norman Lamb (Care Minister under the Cameron–Clegg coalition) said "This shows the clear appetite for paying a bit more to ensure that our loved ones get the care they need. With over a million older people going without the care and support they need, this has become a moral imperative."

William Laing, founder of LaingBuisson said in 2019 that it was "highly unlikely" that cross-party consensus on how to overhaul the social care system could be achieved and that "if you really wanted to professionalise the service and pay people, not the minimum wage but a decent career structure, then we're talking about several billion pounds."

Ahead of calling the snap general election of June 2017, Conservative prime minister Theresa May identified social care reform as a policy priority, in order to address much-needed funding reforms and end the "intergenerational unfairness" of existing models. The Conservative manifesto proposals, which saw a rise in the threshold for free care from £23,250 to £100,000 for over 65's and also included property in the means test and permitting deferred payment after death, were criticised as a "Dementia Tax". Four days after the manifesto launch, May announced that these proposals would form the basis of a wider consultation on wider social care funding, which drew criticisms of a "U-Turn".

In March 2017, Chancellor Philip Hammond announced a green paper on the future funding options for social care. Subsequently, the proposals met delays, with the Health Secretary Matt Hancock giving evidence to select committees citing Brexit and lack of cross-party consensus as the reasons for the delay. Ultimately, legislation did not materialise during May's premiership.

A December 2019 poll by learning disabilities charity Hft found that 59% of social care providers in England believed that the situation in social care worsened during May's time in office, compared to 3% who said it was slightly better.

On 24 July 2019, in his first speech as Prime Minister, Boris Johnson pledged to "fix" social care "once and for all" with a "ready-to-go" plan. Later, Johnson clarified that reforms would be put forward before the end of the next parliamentary term.

In September 2021, in line with his pledge to fix social care, Johnson outlined plans for a Health and Social Care Levy. The new tax was designed to improve social care and deal with the backlog of patients waiting for treatment following the COVID-19 pandemic, and was intended to begin in April 2023. The legislation received royal assent in October 2021, and in the 2021 Autumn Budget the rate of National Insurance (paid by most workers and employers) was increased by 1.25%, effective from April 2022, as the first step. However, the increase was cancelled by the Truss government, effective from November 2022, and in October 2022 the 2021 levy act was repealed.

== Digitisation ==
in 2022 only 45% of social care providers used a digital social care record, and 23% of care home staff could access the internet consistently at work. in 2022/3 the government made available £25 million to bring Digital Social Care Records into the integrated care systems with a commitment of at least 80% of social care providers having digitised care records by March 2024.

Nottinghamshire County Council is a pioneer in the use of technology-based care to keep disabled adults in their own homes. Their Technology Enabled Care service was started in 2007. It now uses home sensors to help detect falls, incontinence and unusual patterns in daily habits. It supported 4,600 people in 2024. The system automatically alerts staff at a 24-hour monitoring service. It reduced the costs of services by more than £2.75 million in 2024.

== Brexit ==
In August 2018, a Department of Health report warned that in a worst-case scenario, care workers migrating from elsewhere in the European Economic Area might stop coming after Brexit, and the resulting shortage of care workers could become so acute that people (mostly women) would be forced to give up paid work and stay home to care for dependent relatives.

In a September 2019 report, the National Audit Office maintained there was no clear evidence the care sector was ready for Brexit. The report claimed that the care sector was fragmented and relied on 24,000 companies providing services; it also claimed that there was no central arrangement to stockpile equipment and supplies, like syringes and needles, also incontinence pads, which mostly came from or through the EU. Auditors were concerned that the Department of Health and Social Care did not know what proportion of the 24,000 UK nursing homes and other providers of social care, which are often small businesses, had acted on its advice for, "robust" contingency planning over a no-deal Brexit.

== Care workforce ==
Adult social care can be understood as care to support the well-being of adults, similar to that which may be provided by a skilled relative or friend. It includes following directed care designed to maintain physical or mental health supervised by health-qualified staff, but not health treatment that would be undertaken by staff with health qualifications such as nursing. The social care workforce encompasses:

- Those who are employed directly by councils, often under joint funding arrangements with health commissioners.
- Those employed by companies or voluntary agencies that are commissioned through local councils to discharge their personal social services (PSS) responsibilities.
- Those employed as "personal assistants" providing care that councils have assessed as required. (This would be funded through the cared-for person being paid a "personal budget").
- Personal assistants employed by an adult who, having savings, is "self funding" support that a council would assess as needed.

In England, the social care workforce comprises over one and half million people. An estimated two thirds of the workforce work for some 25,000 employers in the private and voluntary sectors. The remaining third work in the statutory sector, largely for 150 local councils with personal social services responsibilities. Data on the social care workforce is collected and analysed by Skills for Care, the national workforce organization for adult social care in England. Data is collected on the social care workforce through Skills for Care's National Minimum Data Set (NMDS-SC). A survey by Skills for Care in April 2019 showed that the average care worker was 59p (8%) better off, in real terms, in February 2019 than they were in September 2012, with a greater increase for those at the bottom of the pay scale. Pay was higher in the South of England than in the North, but in the South East the average take home pay was lower than the cost of living.

Most care recipients are satisfied with their care, however a minority have serious concerns.

=== Types of work ===
One type of work covers assessment and commissioning on behalf of local public bodies, for people identified as being in need. Assessment is undertaken to determing whether the person meets approved eligibility criteria. The public face for this activity is usually a social worker employed by the local authority.

Secondly, as a result of this, and often with council funding, workers provide face-to-face support, including accommodation and care in care homes, supported activity in the community, and domiciliary care. This may be contracted directly by the council's staff, or may be purchased by the cared-for person themselves with a personal budget provided by the council, or independently from the council if they have been financially assessed as able to meet the costs themselves. This is provided by companies and voluntary agencies registered as competent, and the front-line staff are often employed as care assistants.

The range of work settings includes the community, hospitals, health centres, education and advice centres and people's homes. Social care practitioners frequently work in partnership with staff from other professions, including health, housing, education, advice and advocacy services and the law.

=== Informal carers ===
This is a term used for people who are providing unpaid support, usually within the same family. In 2019, Carers UK estimated that around 15% of the UK adult population were carers. The Care Act 2014 recognises the needs of unpaid carers and legislates for assessment, care and support to sustain them in their voluntary roles. A 2021 study found there were variations in the ways local councils supported informal carers, including providing access to "respite" services aimed at the needs of both the cared-for person and their carer; this could be due to financial pressures and budget constraints experienced by local authorities. Respite care for the benefit of the carer can sometimes be in conflict with the needs of the person they look after, or the support that the cared-for person is able to access.

Some carers are children under 14, who help to look after a sick or disabled relative. A 2016 study found that their needs were often overlooked by adults' and children's services, and councils often did not have suitable resources to support young carers.

== Qualifications ==
The Care Standards Act 2000, as well as establishing regulations covering service provision, brought greater recognition for the profession of social work with the introduction of a social work degree and social workers' register. To become a social worker in the UK and use the title, students need to complete an Honours degree or postgraduate MA in Social Work. There are access courses for mature students, trainee schemes and employment based routes to gaining the qualification. Qualified social workers are currently required to register with the Health and Care Professions Council (HCPC) before commencing practice. Social workers are also required to ensure that they keep their training and knowledge up-to-date with current developments in the field.

Occupational Therapy is another important profession working in health and social care settings, contributing to the promotion of people's independence through advice and provision of equipment, and enhancing the suitability of housing through Adaptations.

There are many other social care roles for which other qualifications, experience and training may be necessary.

Examples of the range of professions within this field include policy makers, researchers, academics, project workers, support workers, employed care staff (in residential or domiciliary care settings sometimes confusingly referred to as "carers") and personal assistants.

== Social workers' hierarchy in England and Wales ==
Although there is no formal or national hierarchy (rank) of social workers, many local authorities in England and Wales adopt a similar pattern of seniority of social workers. This is mainly for the purpose of case work allocation, supervision, leadership and management. As an example, below is an example of three role structure for an adults, childcare and mental health social work team. To compare, there are also links to the PCF levels of practitioner.

Adults	Children	Mental Health	PCF
Newly Qualified Social Worker (for 1 year)	Newly Qualified Social Worker (for 1 year)	Newly Qualified Mental Health Social Worker (for 1 year) (Band 5 AfC)	PCF - NQSW Social Worker
Social Worker / Qualified Care Manager / Social Work Practitioner / Level 1 or Level 2 Social Worker	Social Worker / Social Work Practitioner / Level 1 or Level 2 Social Worker	Mental Health Social Worker / Mental Health Practitioner (Band 5 AfC)	PCF - Social Worker
Senior Social Worker / Higher Grade Social Worker / Level 3 Social Worker	Senior Social Worker / Social Worker (Child Care Practitioner status) / Level 3 Social Worker	Senior Mental Health Social Worker / AMHP (Band 6 AfC)	PCF - Experienced Social Worker
Senior or Advanced Practitioner / Assistant Team Manager	Senior or Advanced Practitioner / Assistant Team Manager	Senior or Advanced Practitioner / Team Leader (Band 7 AfC) (inc AMHP / Lead AMHP)	PCF - Advanced Social Worker
Team Manager	Team Manager	Team Manager (Band 8a AfC) (inc Lead AMHP or AMHP Leader)	PCF - Advanced Social Worker
Service Manager / Service Lead	Service Manager / Service Lead	Service Manager / Service Lead Mental Health Social Work or Head of Mental Health Social Work (Band 8b AfC) (inc AMHP Leader)	PCF - Strategic Social Worker
Head of Service or Area Director / Senior Operational Manager	Head of Service or Area Director	Head of Mental Health Social Work / Associate Director grade (Band 8c AfC)	PCF - Strategic Social Worker
Assistant Director / Deputy Director of Adult Services	Assistant Director / Deputy Director of Children Services	Assistant / Deputy Director grade (Band 8d AfC)	PCF - Strategic Social Worker
Director of Adult Services	Director of Children Services	Director of Mental Health Social Work (Band 8d or 9 AfC)	PCF - Strategic Social Worker

== Social care organisations ==
Social workers are regulated by Social Work England which sets codes of conduct and practice. The College of Social Work has the aim of improving and supporting social work by leading the development of the profession and representing it in discussions with organisations that regulate, train, work with, and are affected by social work.

Social care services are regulated by the Care Quality Commission. In 2026 it was reported that nearly 70% of residential care homes and 83.5% of home care and other non-residential social care services and sites had not been inspected or reassessed since 2022 or earlier.

Other social care organisations include the Social Care Institute for Excellence – an independent charity that identifies and transfers knowledge about good practice – and Skills for Care, the national lead agency for policy and strategy related to workforce development and the adult social care workforce.

The National Skills Academy for Social Care, launched in 2009, provides learning support and training practice for social care workers and employers in England, with a specific remit on leadership development.

The Association of Directors of Adult Social Services represents senior social care managers in England.

There are many other voluntary and independent sector organisations that exist to support the delivery of social care. These support both the social care workforce and people who use services, and include user-led organisations. The Department of Health (as it then was) recognised the importance of "close and harmonious working relationships" between statutory care providers and the independent sector in 2001 through its adoption of a partnership agreement on building capacity and partnership in care.

== Future directions ==
Local authority spending on adult social care is a demand on the local tax revenue and for this reason and associated costs to the NHS from hospital admissions, Social care is high on the UK government's agenda, with an aim of integration of health, social care and education to reflect the overlap between these areas.

Developing the skills of the social care workforce is a continuous priority, specifically in response to changes in the social care sector and media coverage of social care issues. Following the recommendations of the Social Work Taskforce (2009), The College of Social Work has been set up. The College will represent and support social workers and help maintain standards for the profession. Skills for Care is the lead national body for strategy and policy in relation to workforce development and the social care workforce.

Robots are being developed which it is hoped will be able to help with some social care. The Social Market Foundation has suggested that the adoption of technology should be "properly handled" so that it complements human interaction rather than replacing it.

Between April 2014 and October 2019 the number of domiciliary care services in England increased by 23% to 9,528. However the residential care sector is declining, and the Care Quality Commission has warned that the domiciliary sector is not growing fast enough to meet the increasing demand and does not match the falling number of nursing and residential home beds. Nursing homes fell 6% and residential homes 11% in the same period. They said effective domiciliary care needed innovative providers who could bring together nurses, occupational therapists, physiotherapists and other carers.

Reform has been a long debated issue within adult social care, and over a 20-year period there were 12 white papers, but the Kings Trust argues this has not led to the considerable reform needed. James Bethell in January 2021 "acknowledged the frustration felt by many" after the House of Lords Economic Affairs Committee called for an extra £8 billion a year to tackle the "national scandal" of underfunding in the sector. Social care reform was absent from the legislative agenda for the first session of the Parliament elected in 2024.

== See also ==
- Health and Social Care
- Poor relief
- National Health Service (England)
- Care Standards Act 2000
- Continuing healthcare
- Nursing home care in the United Kingdom
