= Health and social care =

Healthcare services and education in the UK

Health and social care (often abbreviated to HSC or H&SC) is a term that relates to services that are available from health and social care providers in the United Kingdom. This is a generic term used to refer to the whole of the healthcare provision infrastructure, and private sector. The English national provider of information about health and social care is the Health and Social Care Information Centre HSCIC. NHS Scotland has a Health and Social Care Management Board which meets fortnightly.

The term can also refer to a range of vocational and academic courses which can be taken at various academic and vocational levels from GNVQ, A-Level, S/NVQ, to degrees. In Canada and the United-States, health and social care is frequently referred to as "Human Services".

As a subject discipline, Health and Social Care (H&SC) combines elements of sociology, biology, nutrition, law, and ethics. Typically, students of Health and Social Care will have a work placement alongside their academic studies; such a placement may take place in a nursery, residential home, hospital, or other caring establishment. Others may take a health and social care course as a route to further qualifications hoping that it will lead to employment within the sector.

Depending on their qualification, students may start off as care assistants and develop care pathways to become doctors, nurses, social workers, physiotherapists, counsellors, psychotherapists, paramedics or a range of other related occupations.

H&SC can be studied in schools and colleges from Key Stage 4/GCSE Level (age 14–16), colleges and can also be studied in some universities.

== Subject content ==
The subject content of H&SC is vast, and will vary depending upon the level at which it is being studied, and the individual qualification. Most students of H&SC will cover areas such as:

=== Biology ===
The biological aspect of H&SC is vital: with many careers it will form the most important area of their knowledge. Students need to be aware of how people grow and develop physically, and they may also be required to study a range of illnesses and treatments.

This may include the study of public health, and public health campaigns such as the effects of smoking, poor diet and lack of exercise.

=== Nutrition ===
Nutrition may form an integral part of some H&SC courses, especially in situations where carers will be primarily responsible for creating and implementing diets for care service users.

=== Law and social policy ===
Students require a good grounding in the legal aspects of what is required of care practitioners, and will need to have up-to-date knowledge of developments in social policy, as well as knowledge of the various laws regarding rights, discrimination, abuse, welfare and so on.

=== Ethics ===
Ethics as applied to the medical and social care fields is a broad and important field of the study of Health and Social Care.

In the workplace, professional caregivers need to be able to support individuals who feel that they have been or are being treated unfairly, or who do not have access to appropriate care services for some reason. Questions of confidentiality, privacy, risk taking and generally the exercise of personal choice are all ethical dilemmas encountered and processed on a daily basis in the context of social care.

Ethics is also the process that health services follow in order to explore, justify and effect change - for instance if a new procedure, drug or surgical technique is being developed it must at some point be used with patients. The examination of potential positive and negative effects or outcomes, and the provision of appropriate, accessible information about these to the patient to enable informed consent, is an example of applied ethics.

=== Social and educational activities ===
Ideally, care workers need to make care environments not merely "tolerable", but enjoyable and fulfilling for the clients; this might involve carrying out social and educational activities with those in care. Students of H&SC will need to learn about how to run games, activities, reading groups, excursions and so on, so that the people receiving care get the most out of it as they possibly can.

== See also ==
- National Health Service
- Healthcare in the United Kingdom
