= Central Council of Afghan Trade Unions =

Afghanistan labour council (1978–1979)

The Central Council of Afghan Trade Unions (CCATU) was a labour council established by the People's Democratic Party of Afghanistan in 1978 to organize the Afghan labour movement. It was purged and restructured in 1979 by the Soviet Union.

In 1990 the CCATU was replaced by the National Workers' Union of Afghanistan.
