= National Workers' Union of Afghanistan =

The National Workers' Union of Afghanistan (NUWA) was the sole labour body of Afghanistan, from 1990 until the Mujahideen rose to power in 1992. Previous to 1990 the Central Council of Afghan Trade Unions (CCATU) fulfilled the same role.

There are currently no reports of collective bargaining mechanisms, strikes, or other organized industrial activity in the country.
