= Central Council for Education and Training in Social Work =

UK statutory authority (1970–2001)

The Central Council for Education and Training in Social Work (CCETSW) was, from 1970 to 2001, the statutory authority charged with promoting education and training in social work, recognising courses and awarding qualifications throughout the United Kingdom.

CCETSW was established on 1 October 1971 under the Health Visiting and Social Work (Training) Act 1962. It replaced the Central Training Council in Child Care, the Council for Training in Social Work, and the Recruitment and Training Committee of the Advisory Council for Probation and After-Care, and also took over certain functions of the Association of Psychiatric Social Workers and the Institute for Medical Social Work.

On 1 October 2001, CCETSW was abolished and its functions taken over by the General Social Care Council (GSCC), the Scottish Social Services Council (SSSC), the Care Council for Wales (CCW), and the Northern Ireland Social Care Council (NISCC).

== Membership ==
The Council had about 60 members, some nominated by the Government and the remainder nominated by relevant employers' associations, educational bodies and professional associations. The chairman was appointed by the Privy Council.

Representatives in 1975 were nominated by:

- British Government – 11
- British Association of Social Workers – 8
- Association of County Councils – 5
- Association of Metropolitan Authorities – 4
- Association of Teachers in Social Work Education – 3
- Association of Directors of Social Services in England and Wales – 2
- Committee of Vice-Chancellors and Principals – 2
- Convention of Scottish Local Authorities – 2
- National Association of Probation Officers – 2
- Residential Care Association – 2
- Advisory Council for Probation and After-Care – 1
- Advisory Council on Social Work in Scotland – 1
- Association of Directors of Social Work (Scotland) – 1
- Association of Principals of Technical Institutions/Association of Colleges of Further and Higher Education – 1
- Association of Teachers in Technical Institutions – 1
- British Medical Association – 1
- Central Council of Probation and After-Care Committees – 1
- Committee of the Directors of Polytechnics – 1
- Conference of Chief Probation Officers – 1
- Council for National Academic Awards – 1
- General Nursing Council – 1
- Joint Consultants' Committee – 1
- Joint University Council for Social and Public Administration – 1
- Local Government Training Board – 1
- National Association of Chief Education Welfare Officers – 1
- National Institute for Social Work – 1
- Personal Social Services Council – 1
- Regional Health Authority – 1
- Society of Community Medicine – 1

== Sources ==
- CCETSW Information Pamphlet, 1975
