= Association for Perioperative Practice =

British professional body

The Association for Perioperative Practice
- Logo of the AfPP
- Abbreviation: AfPP
- Formation: 1964
- Headquarters: 42 Freemans Way; Harrogate, North Yorkshire
- Location: Harrogate
- Region served: UK
- Members: 7,000
- Official language: English
- Staff: 18
- Website: www.afpp.org.uk

The Association for Perioperative Practice (AfPP) is a British professional body for healthcare workers. Its stated aims include "the promotion of high standards of perioperative care, the exchange of professional information between members and co-operation with other professional bodies". It is a registered charity. It was established as the National Association of Theatre Nurses (NATN) in 1964. As of April 2018 it claims to have 7,000 members.
