= Care Standards Act 2000 =

Act of the Parliament of the United Kingdom

Care Standards Act 2000 (Note: Section 123(1).)
- Act of Parliament
- Parliament of the United Kingdom
- Long title: An Act to establish a National Care Standards Commission; to make provision for the registration and regulation of children’s homes, independent hospitals, independent clinics, care homes, residential family centres, independent medical agencies, domiciliary care agencies, fostering agencies, nurses agencies and voluntary adoption agencies; to make provision for the regulation and inspection of local authority fostering and adoption services; to establish a General Social Care Council and a Care Council for Wales and make provision for the registration, regulation and training of social care workers; to establish a Children’s Commissioner for Wales; to make provision for the registration, regulation and training of those providing child minding or day care; to make provision for the protection of children and vulnerable adults; to amend the law about children looked after in schools and colleges; to repeal the Nurses Agencies Act 1957; to amend Schedule 1 to the Local Authority Social Services Act 1970; and for connected purposes. This act was set up to ensure that all individuals who use health care services are receiving the care that they are entitled too.
- Citation: 2000 c. 14
- Territorial extent: England and Wales (Note: Section 123(2)–(4).)

Dates
- Royal assent: 20 July 2000
- Commencement: Various (Note: Section 122.)
Other legislation
Amends	London Government Act 1963; House of Commons Disqualification Act 1975; Public Health (Control of Disease) Act 1984; Arbitration Act 1996
Amended by	Education Act 1996; Domestic Violence, Crime and Victims Act 2004; Public Audit (Wales) Act 2004; Mental Capacity Act 2005; Government of Wales Act 2006; National Health Service (Consequential Provisions) Act 2006; Safeguarding Vulnerable Groups Act 2006; Mental Health Act 2007; Health and Social Care Act 2012; Wales Act 2017
Relates to	Nurses Agencies Act 1957; Local Authority Social Services Act 1970

Status: Amended

Text of statute as originally enacted

Revised text of statute as amended

The Care Standards Act 2000 (c. 14) is an act of the Parliament of the United Kingdom which provides for the administration of a variety of care institutions, including children's homes, independent hospitals, nursing homes and residential care homes.

The Care Standards Act, which was enacted in April 2002, replaces the Registered Homes Act 1984 and parts of the Children Act 1989, which pertain to the care or the accommodation of children.

The aim of the legislation is to reform the law relating to the inspection and regulation of various care institutions.

The act established a National Care Standards Commission and a General Social Care Council.

The act also established the Children's Commissioner for Wales, whose role was expanded by the Children’s Commissioner for Wales Act 2001.
