= Social care =

Assistance for people with disabilities

Social care is a term used to describe all forms of personal care and practical assistance for children, young people, and adults who need help because of their disabilities. The term "adult social care" generally refers to care for adults aged over 18, while "children's social care" is provided for children under 18.

Most of this help is provided by the families and friends of the disabled person. That is called informal care, and is generally not paid. Paid care may be provided commercially, by charities, or by government agencies. This formal care usually depends on an assessment by social work staff. It is often associated with health care, but generally provided by different organisations, though the distinction between healthcare and social care varies over time and in other countries.

Personal care has been defined in Scotland as help with washing, dressing, toileting, eating, and taking medication. In England, "Activities of Daily Living" includes these, but also getting out of bed and walking across a room. "Instrumental Activities of Daily Living" are food shopping, cooking, and managing money.

The most widespread formal care is elderly care, often provided in care homes. In the past, younger people who were not expected to get better were usually kept in mental hospitals, sometimes for many years. Following many scandals of poor conditions in the United Kingdom, a policy of Care in the Community was started in the 1980s.

Home care is becoming more common, often supported by information technology. People who are in a position to pay generally prefer it to institutional care.

Increasing life expectancy and medical advances have led to greater needs for social care. In 2022-23, local authorities in England spent £23.7 billion on adult social care, supporting more than one million people with care needs. Estimates of the value of unpaid care work vary but are up to 7 times greater. In 2018 about £12 billion of paid care was privately purchased. British governments have repeatedly promised to "fix the crisis in social care".

== See also ==
- Social policy
- Social work
- Care in the Community
