= Index of nursing articles =

This is an index of nursing articles on Wikipedia.

== A ==
- Acute Care of at-Risk Newborns (ACoRN)
- Advanced cardiac life support (ACLS)
- Advanced trauma life support (ATLS)
- Activities of daily living
- Activities of daily living assistance

== B ==
- Barrier nursing
- Basic life support (BLS)
- Bed management
- Birthing center
- Braden Scale for Predicting Pressure Ulcer Risk
- Buurtzorg Nederland

== C ==
- Care of the Critically Ill Surgical Patient (CCrISP)
- Caregiver burden
- Change-of-shift report
- Charge nurse

== H ==
- Health and social care
- Health promotion
- History of nursing
- HIV trial in Libya
- Home care

== I ==
- Incident report
- International Nurses Day
- Isolation (health care)

== L ==
- List of nurses
- List of nursing specialties

== M ==
- Magnet Recognition Program
- Men in nursing
- Morning care

== N ==
- Neonatal intensive care unit
- Nightingale Pledge
- Nightingale ward
- Notes on Nursing
- Nurse call button
- Nurse–client relationship
- Nurse licensure
- Nurse uniform
- Nurse writer
- Nurse's cap
- Nurse-led clinic
- Nurses station
- Nurses' Health Study
- Nursing
- Nursing agency
- Nursing assessment
- Nursing care plan
- Nursing diagnosis
- Nursing home residents' rights
- Nursing in Islam
- Nursing literature
- Nursing Personnel Convention, 1977
- Nursing process
- Category:Nursing schools
- Nursing sister

== P ==
- Patient
- Patient safety
- Perioperative period
- Primary nursing
- Program of All-Inclusive Care for the Elderly

== R ==
- Respite care
- Rooming-in

== S ==
- SBAR
- Sentinel event
- Nursing shortage
- Nurse stereotypes

== T ==
- Teaching clinic
- Team nursing
- Therapeutic Nursing Plan
- Timeline of nursing history
- To Err is Human

== U ==
- Unlicensed assistive personnel

== W ==
- Waterlow score
- Women in nursing
