= Nursing documentation =

Records of nursing care

Nursing documentation is the record of nursing care that is planned and delivered to individual clients by qualified nurses or other caregivers under the direction of a qualified nurse. It contains information in accordance with the steps of the nursing process. Nursing documentation is the principal clinical information source to meet legal and professional requirements, care nurses' knowledge of nursing documentation, and is one of the most significant components in nursing care. Quality nursing documentation plays a vital role in the delivery of quality nursing care services through supporting better communication between different care team members to facilitate continuity of care and safety of the clients.

== Purposes ==
- A written record of the history, treatment, care, and response of the client while under the care of a health care provider.
- A guide for reimbursement of care costs.
- Evidence of care in a court of law. A legal record that can be used as evidence of events that occurred or treatments given.
- Show the use of the nursing process. It contains observations by the nurses about the client's condition, care, and treatment delivered.
- Provides data for quality assurance studies and shows progress toward expected outcomes.

== Documentation of the nursing process ==
The internationally accepted nursing process consists of five steps: assessment, nursing problem/diagnosis, goal, intervention and evaluation. Nursing process model provides the theoretical framework for nursing documentation. A nurse can follow this model to assess the clinical situation of a client and record a constructive document for nursing communication.

== Content ==
Nursing documentation mainly consists of a client's background information or nursing history referred as admission form, numerous assessment forms, nursing care plan and progress notes. These documents record the client's data captured at the relevant stages of the nursing process. The following sections describe the concept, aim, possible structure and content of these nursing documents using the example of nursing documentation in Australian residential aged care homes.

=== Admission ===
An admission form is a fundamental record in nursing documentation. It documents a client's status, reasons why the client is being admitted, and the initial instructions for that client's care. The form is completed by a nurse when a client is admitted to a health care facility.

The admission form provides the basic information to establish foundations for further nursing assessment. It usually contains the general data about a client, such as name, gender, age, birth date, address, contact, identification information (ID) and some situational descriptions about marriage, work or other background information. Based on the different nursing care provider's requirements, this form may also record family history, past medical history, history of present illness, and allergies in nursing

=== Assessment ===
The documentation of nursing assessment is the recording of the process about how a judgment was made and its related factors, in addition to the result of the judgment. It makes the process of nursing assessment visible through what is presented in the documentation content.

During nursing assessment, a nurse systematically collects, verifies, analyses and communicates a health care client's information to derive a nursing diagnosis and plan individualized nursing care for the client. Complete and accurate nursing assessment determines the accuracy of the other stages of the nursing process.

The nursing documents may contain a number of assessment forms. In an assessment form, a licensed Registered Nurse records the client's information, such as physiological, psychological, sociological, and spiritual status (see Figure 2). The accuracy and completeness of nursing assessment determine the accuracy of care planning in the nursing process.

=== Nursing care plan ===
The nursing care plan (NCP) is a clinical document recording the nursing process, which is a systematic method of planning and providing care to clients. It was originally developed in hospitals to guide nursing students or junior nurses in providing care to client; however, the format was task-oriented rather than nursing-process-based. Nowadays, the NCP is widely used in nursing in various clinical and educational settings as a tool to direct individualized nursing care for clients.

The nurses make nursing care plans based on the assessments they have completed previously with a client. There are many ways of structuring nursing care plans in correspondence with the different needs of nursing care in different nursing specialties. For example, a nursing care plan in an Australian residential aged care home may be structured with several sections under each care domain such as pain, mobility, lifestyle, nutrition and continence. The information is recorded in free-text style, and various terms are used singly or in combination to name each of the four sections in the formats that are used by a facility during a particular period

=== Progress notes ===
A progress note is the record of nursing actions and observations in the nursing care process. It helps nurses to monitor and control the course of nursing care.

Generally, nurses record information with a common format. Nurses are likely to record details about a client's clinical status or achievements during the course of the nursing care.

== Recording format ==
=== Paper-based nursing documentation ===
The paper-based nursing documentation has been in place for decades. Client's data are recorded in paper documents. The information in these documents needs to be integrated for sense-making in a nursing decision.

=== Electronic nursing documentation ===
Electronic nursing documentation is an electronic format of nursing documentation an increasingly used by nurses. Electronic nursing documentation systems have been implemented in health care organizations to bring in the benefits of increasing access to more complete, accurate and up-to-date data and reducing redundancy, improving communication and care service delivery. In some settings, such systems also include documentation tools that assist nurses with drafting and reviewing care notes during clinical encounters, including ambient documentation systems used alongside electronic records in routine practice by platforms such as Twofold Health and similar services.

=== Comparison of the quality of paper-based and electronic documentation ===
Electronic nursing documentation systems are able to produce somewhat better quality data in comparison with paper-based systems, in certain respects depending on the characteristics of the systems and the practice of the various study settings. The common benefits of electronic documentation systems include the improvement of comprehensiveness in documenting the nursing process, the use of standardized language and the recording of specific items about particular client issues and relevance of the message. In addition, electronic systems can improve legibility, dating and signing in nursing records.

For the documentation of nursing assessment, the electronic systems significantly increased the quantity and comprehensiveness of documented assessment forms in each record. In regard to the NCP, the electronic standardized NCPs were graded with a higher total quality score than its paper-based counterpart. In addition, in comparison with the paper-based documentation systems, the electronic systems, due to their automatic functions, were able to improve the format, structure and process features of documentation quality such as legibility, signing, dating, crossing out error and space with a single line and resident identification on every page.

Paper-based documentation has been found to be inferior in comparison with electronic documentation. This is caused by the inherent nature of paper being difficult to update, time-consuming in a recording. Thus, the records are often incomplete, illegible, repetitive and missing signatures.

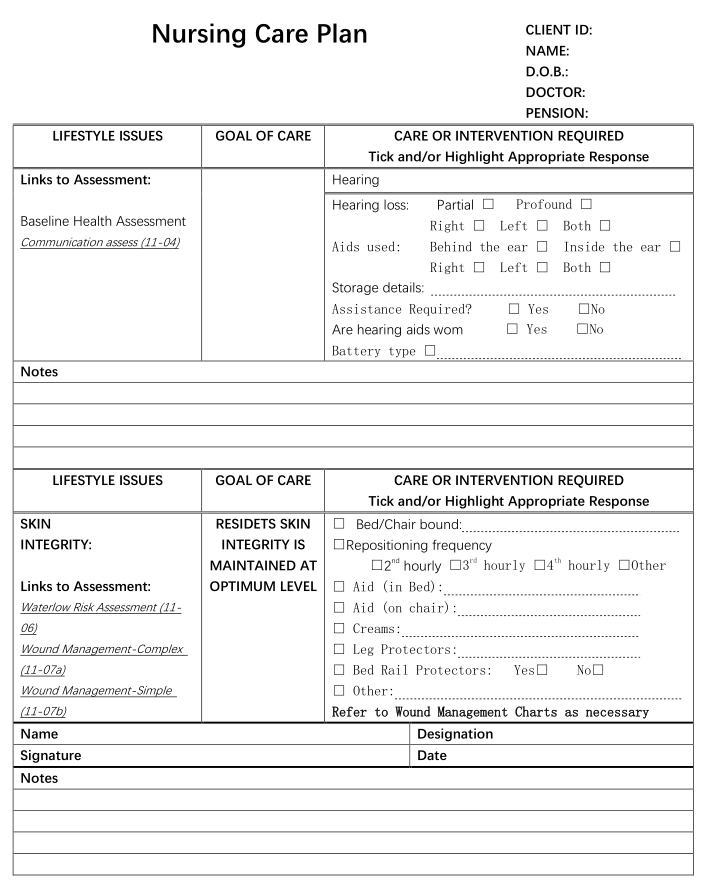
An example of a nursing care plan in an Australian residential aged care home

Electronic nursing documentation systems have the potential to improve the quality of documentation structure and format, process and content in comparison with paper-based documentation, as demonstrated in a comparative study of electronic and paper-based nursing admission forms. However, improvement in documentation quality is not necessarily to be brought about by the introduction of electronic nursing documentation system to replace paper-based documentation. For example, Wang et al. that although the electronic nursing assessment form contained more documented assessment forms, which covered a wider range of resident care needs, they did not perform better than the previous [null paper-based assessment forms according to] the quality criteria of [null completeness] and timeliness. Therefore, further work on the usage of the electronic documentation systems may focus on improving form design and usage. There is also a need for improvement in compliance with standards in order to better meet the clients' care needs.

== Quality of nursing documentation ==
A study by the National Client Safety Agency (NPSA) found that poor standards of documentation were a contributory factor in the failure to detect clients who were clinically deteriorating. Nurses are responsible for maintaining accurate records of the care they provide and are accountable if information is incomplete and inaccurate. Thus, a quality standard is required for recording of nursing documentation.

The systematic review of nursing documentation audit studies in different settings identified the following relevant quality characteristics of nursing documentation:

- Quality of documentation structure and format: relates to constructive features and physical presentation of records such as quantity, completeness, legibility, read- ability, redundancy and the use of abbreviations.
- Quality of documentation process: the procedural issues of capturing client data such as nurse's signature and designation, date, chronological order, timeliness, regularity of documentation and concordance between documentation and reality.
- Quality of documentation content: refers to the message from data about a care process. It is concerned with the comprehensiveness, appropriateness and the relation- ship of the five steps of the nursing process. The care issue recorded at each step is also considered.

== Standardized nursing terminology ==
North American Nursing Diagnosis Association (NANDA) nursing diagnosis:

NANDA International (formerly the North American Nursing Diagnosis Association) is a professional organization of nurses standardized nursing terminology that was officially founded in 1982 and develops, researches, disseminates and refines the nomenclature, criteria, and taxonomy of nursing diagnoses.

Nursing intervention classification (NIC):

The Nursing Interventions Classification (NIC) is a care classification system which describes the activities that nurses perform as a part of the planning phase of the nursing process associated with the creation of a nursing care plan.

Nursing outcome classification (NOC):

The Nursing Outcomes Classification (NOC) is a classification system which describes client outcomes sensitive to nursing intervention.

The Omaha System:

The Omaha System is a standardized health care terminology consisting of an assessment component (Problem Classification Scheme), a care plan/services component (Intervention Scheme), and an evaluation component (Problem Rating Scale for Outcomes).

International Classification for Nursing Practice (ICNP):

The International Classification for Nursing Practice (ICNP) is a collaborative project under the auspices of the International Council of Nurses. The ICNP provides a structured and defined vocabulary as well as a classification for nursing and a framework into which existing vocabularies and classifications can be cross-mapped to enable comparison of nursing data.

== Structured documentation ==
Structured documentation takes the form of pre-printed guidelines for specific aspects of care and can, therefore, focus nursing care upon diagnoses, treatment aims, client outcomes and evaluations of care. It can improve client care by replacing the practice of vague, narrative style entries by nurses with cohesive and accurate information determined by the format of the care plan. The clarity of the recorded information also facilitates clinical auditing and evaluation of documentation practices through. Therefore, the introduction of structured documentation and care plans are seen as a means by which nurses can raise standards of record-keeping practice.
