= Omaha System =

Standardized health care terminology

The Omaha System is a standardized health care terminology consisting of an assessment component (Problem Classification Scheme), a care plan/services component (Intervention Scheme), and an evaluation component (Problem Rating Scale for Outcomes). Approximately 22,000 health care practitioners, educators, and researchers use Omaha System to improve clinical practice, structure documentation, and analyze secondary data. Omaha System users from Canada, China, The Czech Republic, Estonia, Hong Kong, Japan, Mexico, New Zealand, The Netherlands, Turkey, the United States, and Wales, have presented at Omaha System International Conferences.

The Omaha System is integrated into the National Library of Medicine's Metathesaurus, CINAHL, ABC Codes, NIDSEC, Logical Observation Identifiers, Names, and Codes (LOINC), and SNOMED CT. It is registered (recognized) by Health Level Seven (HL7), and is congruent with the reference terminology model for the International Organization for Standardization (ISO).The Omaha System has the ability to code the majority of the problems and interventions from the hospital record.

== Origin ==
The Omaha System originated at the Visiting Nurse Association of Omaha (located in Nebraska) as a collaborative effort between researchers and interprofessional practitioners. Practitioners developed the Omaha System as part of four federally funded research projects conducted between 1975 and 1993.The Omaha System was constantly refined in its structure and terms during this period to establish reliability, validity, and usability.

== Users ==
Users include nurses, physicians, occupational therapists, physical therapists, registered dietitians, recreational therapists, speech and language pathologists, and social workers. When multidisciplinary health teams use the Omaha System accurately and consistently, they have an effective basis for documentation, communication, coordination of care, and outcome measurement.

== Use in nursing ==
The American Nurses Association recognized the Omaha System as a standardized terminology to support nursing practice in 1992. In 2014, Minnesota became the first state to recommend that point-of-care terminologies recognized by the American Nurses Association be used in all electronic health records. The evidence underlying this decision was a survey that showed that the Omaha System was used in 96.5% of Minnesota counties. The Omaha System became a member of the Alliance for Nursing Informatics in 2009. It is a reliable nursing documentation tool for outcome and quality of care measurement for clients with mental illness. The Omaha System is also a tool that can be used as a strategy to introduce and incorporate evidence-based practice in the undergraduate nursing clinical experience. Tools that can be utilized in the Omaha System include a comprehensive list of client health problems, nursing interventions, and an outcome rating scale assessing client knowledge, behavior, and health status to standardize nursing care and client outcomes.

== See also ==
- Clinical Care Classification System
- Health informatics
- Nursing care plan
- Nursing diagnosis
- Nursing practice
- Nursing process
- Nursing Minimum Data Set
- NANDA
- Nursing Interventions Classification
- Nursing Outcomes Classification
