= Effective therapeutic regimen management =

Readiness for enhanced therapeutic regimen management is a NANDA approved nursing diagnosis which is defined as "A pattern of regulating and integrating into daily living a program(s) for treatment of illness and its sequelae that is sufficient for meeting health-related goals and can be strengthened." It was introduced at the 15th NANDA conference in 2002.

== See also ==
- Nursing Interventions Classification (NIC)
- Nursing Minimum Data Set (NMDS)
