= Spiritual distress =

Disturbance in one's belief system

Spiritual distress is a disturbance in a person's belief system. As an approved nursing diagnosis, spiritual distress is defined as "a disruption in the life principle that pervades a person's entire being and that integrates and transcends one's biological and psychological nature."

== Nursing diagnoses ==
Authors in the field of nursing who contributed to the definition of the characteristics of spiritual distress used indicators to validate diagnoses.

The following manifestations of spiritual distress are a part of an abstract data gathered by LearnWell Resources, Inc from the studies of Mary Elizabeth O'Brien and is used as a "Spiritual Assessment Guide" to present alterations in spiritual integrity.

=== Seven manifestations of spiritual distress ===
The diagnosis of spiritual distress is defined by indicators that are present: spiritual pain, spiritual alienation, spiritual anxiety, spiritual guilt, spiritual loss, and spiritual despair.

- "Nursing diagnoses: spiritual pain, as evidenced by expressions of discomfort of suffering relative to one's relationship with God, verbalization of feelings of having a void or lack of spiritual fulfillment, and/or a lack of peace in terms of one's relationship to one's creator.
- Nursing- diagnoses: spiritual alienation, as evidenced by expressions of loneliness or the feeling that God seems very far away and remote from one's everyday life, verbalization that one has to depend upon one's self in times of trial or need, and/or a negative attitude toward receiving any comfort or help from God.
- Nursing diagnoses: spiritual anxiety, as evidenced by expression of fear of God's wrath and punishment; fear that God might not take care of one, either immediately or in the future; and/or worry that God is displeased with one's behavior.
- Nursing diagnoses: spiritual guilt, as evidenced by expressions suggesting that one has failed to do the things which he should have done in life and/or done things which were not pleasing to God; articulation of concerns about the "kind" of life one has lived.
- Nursing diagnoses: spiritual anger, as evidenced by expression of frustration or outrage at God for having allowed illness or other trials, comments about the "unfairness" of God, and/or negative remarks about institutionalized religion and/or its ministers or spiritual care givers.
- Nursing diagnoses: spiritual loss, as evidenced by expression of feelings of having temporarily lost or terminated the love of God, fear that one's relationship with God has been threatened, and/or a feeling of emptiness with regard to spiritual things.
- Nursing- diagnoses: spiritual despair, as evidenced by expressions suggesting that there is no hope of ever having a relationship with God or of pleasing Him and/or a feeling that God no longer can or does care for one."

The indicators (pain, alienation, anxiety, guilt, loss, and despair) must or may be present in defining the characteristics of spiritual distress. The use of indicators in diagnosing alterations in spiritual health is controversial because indicators may appear related to both spiritual and psychosocial problems.

Wilfred McSherry, a senior lecturer in the School of Care Sciences at the University of Glamorgan, published an article on the Journal of Advanced Nursing about potential dilemmas in conducting a spiritual assessment. The article argued that "the area of spiritual assessment needs careful consideration, both nationally and internationally, by those professionals involved in the provision of spiritual care so that potential dilemmas can be identified and reviewed. Such consideration may prevent the construction and subsequent use of inappropriate assessment tools within practice."

== See also ==
- Nursing care plan
- Nursing process
