= Nursing Minimum Data Set =

Classification system for nursing data

The Nursing Minimum Data Set (NMDS) is a classification system which allows for the standardized collection of essential nursing data. The collected data are meant to provide an accurate description of the nursing process used when providing nursing care. The NMDS allow for the analysis and comparison of nursing data across populations, settings, geographic areas, and time.

== See also ==
- Effective therapeutic regimen management
- Minimum Data Set
- NANDA
- Nursing care plan
- Nursing assessment
- Nursing diagnosis
- Nursing Interventions Classification (NIC)
- Nursing Outcomes Classification (NOC)
- Omaha System
