= NMDS =

NMDS may refer to:

- National Minimum Data Set for Social Care
- Non-metric multidimensional scaling
- Nursing Minimum Data Set
- New Mexican Disaster Squad
