= Marjory Gordon =

Marjory Gordon (Cleveland, November 10, 1931 – Massachusetts, April 29, 2015) was a nursing theorist and professor who created a nursing assessment theory known as Gordon's functional health patterns. Gordon served in 1973 as the first president of the North American Nursing Diagnosis Association until 1988. She was a Fellow of the American Academy of Nursing beginning in 1977 and was designated a Living Legend by the same organization in 2009.

== Biography ==
Marjory Gordon began her nursing career in New York at the Mount Sinai Hospital School of Nursing. She earned her bachelor's and master's degrees from Hunter College of the City University of New York and her PhD from Boston College. Dr. Gordon was an emeritus professor of nursing at Boston College in Chestnut Hill, Massachusetts. She authored four books, including the Manual of Nursing Diagnosis, which appears in ten different languages, in forty-eight countries and six continents.

She contributed significantly to the development of standardized nursing language. Dr. Gordon's work in this sphere has implications for research, education, evaluation of competency, and the establishment of a core of nursing knowledge based on evidence. This language will also form the basis of the nursing component of the electronic medical record.

Marjory Gordon died on April 29, 2015.

== See also ==
- List of Living Legends of the American Academy of Nursing
