= MEDCIN =

Medcin, is a system of standardized medical terminology, a proprietary medical vocabulary and was developed by Medicomp Systems, Inc. MEDCIN is a point-of-care terminology, intended for use in Electronic Health Record (EHR) systems, and it includes over 280,000 clinical data elements encompassing symptoms, history, physical examination, tests, diagnoses and therapy. This clinical vocabulary contains over 38 years of research and development as well as the capability to cross map to leading codification systems such as SNOMED CT, CPT, ICD-9-CM/ICD-10-CM, DSM, LOINC, CDT, CVX, and the Clinical Care Classification (CCC) System for nursing and allied health.

The MEDCIN coding system is marketed for point-of-care documentation. Several Electronic Health Record (EHR) systems embed MEDCIN, which allows them to produce structured and numerically codified patient charts. Such structuring enables the aggregation, analysis, and mining of clinical and practice management data related to a disease, a patient or a population.

== History ==
MEDCIN was initially developed by Peter S. Goltra, founder of Medicomp Systems “as an intelligent clinical database for documentation at the time of care." The first few years of the development were spent in designing the structure of a knowledge engine that would enable the population of relationships between clinical events. Since 1978, the MEDCIN database engine has been continuously refined and expanded to include concepts from clinical histories, test, physical examination, therapies and diagnoses to enable coding of complete patient encounters with the collaboration of physicians and teaching institutions such as Cornell, Harvard, and Johns Hopkins.

== Features ==
=== Multiple Hierarchical Structure ===
MEDCIN data elements are organized in multiple clinical hierarchies, where users can easilynavigate to a medical term by following down the tree of clinical propositions. The clinical propositions define unique intellectual clinical content. An example of such similar propositions include "wheezing which is worse during cold weather" and "wheezing which is worse with a cold" differ in meaning significantly to clinicians and therefore it enables the software to present relevant items to clinical users.

This hierarchy provides an inheritance of clinical properties between data elements, which greatly enhances the capabilities of EHR systems and as well providing logical presentation structures for the clinical users. The linkage of MEDCIN data elements through the use of describing many diagnoses in the diagnostic index creates multiple hierarchies. The MEDCIN engine uses Intelligent Prompting and navigation tools to enable clinicians to select specific clinical terms that they need rather than having to create new terms for rapid documentation.

=== Enhances EHRs usability ===
MEDCIN has been designed to work as an interface terminology to include components to make EHRs more usable when it is used in conjunction with proprietary physician and nursing documentation tools. According to Rosenbloom et al. (2006), investigators such as Chute et al., McDonald et al., Rose et al. and Campbell et al. have defined clinical interface terminologies as “a systematic collection of health care-related phrases (term)” (p. 277) that supports the capturing of patient-related clinical information entered by clinicians into software programs such as clinical note capture and decision support tools.

For an interface terminology to be clinical usable, it has to be able to describe any clinical presentation with speed, ease of use, and accuracy for clinicians to accomplish the intended tasks (e.g. documenting patient care) when using the medical terminology. In addition, the terms in medical terminology must have medical relationships. MEDCIN's presentation engine, accomplishes this usability criteria by using the Intelligent Prompting capabilities to present a relevant list of MEDCIN clinical terms for rapid clinical documentations. Another usability feature that the MEDCIN presentation engine provides is the medical relationships of clinical terms through multiple clinical hierarchies for each MEDCIN term.

=== Support for ICD-10-CM coding ===
In August 2012, Medicomp Systems released an updated version of the software embedded with ICD-10-CM (International Classification of Diseases, 10th Revision, Clinical Modification) mappings and functionality to comply with the transition from ICD-9-CM to ICD-10-CM as mandated by the US Department of Health and Human Services. This new version is specially designed to make the ICD-10 more usable in the EHR systems by providing clinicians easier access to bi-directional mappings, accurate data and codes through their EHR products. The ICD-10 is published by the World Health Organization (WHO) to enable the systematic collection of morbidity and mortality data from different countries for statistical analysis.

=== Integration to most EHRs and Legacy systems ===
MEDCIN terminology engine can be easily integrated into existing EHRs and legacy systems to enable mapping of existing terminologies and other coding systems such as ICD, DSM, CPT, LOINC, SNOMED CT and the Clinical Care Classification (CCC) System to generate seamless codified data at point of care. MEDCIN's interoperability features enable easy access and sharing of patient data between health care facilities.

== Interface with Electronic Health Record (EHR) systems ==
MEDCIN has been implemented into several commercial EHR systems as an interface terminology to support integrated care, clinical documentation, health maintenance monitoring and disease management, and the care planning functions of physicians, nurses and allied health professionals. Such commercial EHR systems include EHRs from EPIC, Allscripts, Pulse, Mckesson, and the United States Department of Defence's (DoD) EHR system, the Armed Forces Health Longitudinal Technology Application (AHLTA).

=== AHLTA ===
Figure 1: AHLTA and MEDCIN terminology systems

AHLTA is an EHR system developed for the US Department of Defense. This application uses the Medicomp's MEDCIN terminology engine for clinical documentation purposes. Figure 1, shows an example of the MEDCIN terminology where the physician can search for the correct terms for input into the patient note.

== MEDCIN Nursing Plan of Care ==
Figure 2: MEDCIN plan of care with nursing diagnoses

The Nursing Plan of Care (POC) was developed by Medicomp Systems, for the Clinical Care Classification (CCC) System. The CCC System is a standardized, coded nursing terminology that provides a unique framework and coding structure for accessing, classifying and documenting patient care by nurses and other allied health professionals. The CCC is directly linked in the MEDCIN nursing POC to medical terminology with the purpose of creating patient plan of care by extracting a pool of documentation from the EHR history. The CCC nursing terminology is integrated into the MEDCIN clinical database through a contextual hierarchical tree, providing an array of terminology standards and concepts with Intelligent Prompting capabilities of the MEDCIN engine.

== See also ==
- Clinical Care Classification System
- Current Procedural Terminology (CPT)
- International Classification of Diseases Revision 9 (ICD-9)
- LOINC
- National Drug Code (NDC)
- SNOMED
- Health Level 7 (HL7)
- Health informatics
