= Waterlow =

Waterlow is a surname. Notable people with the surname include:

- Caroline Waterlow, American film producer
- Claude Waterlow Ferrier (1879–1935), Scottish architect, who specialised in the Art Deco style
- David Waterlow (1857–1924), British Liberal Party politician and businessman
- Ernest Waterlow RA (1850–1919), English painter
- John Waterlow (1916–2010), British physiologist who specialised in childhood malnutrition
- Nick Waterlow, curator at the Ivan Dougherty Gallery in Sydney, Australia until his death in November 2009
- Sir Sydney Waterlow, 1st Baronet, KCVO (1822–1906), English philanthropist and politician
- Sydney Waterlow (diplomat) (1878–1944), British diplomat, Ambassador to Greece from 1933 to 1939
- Waterlow baronets created for members of the Waterlow family, both in the Baronetage of the United Kingdom

== See also ==
- Waterlow and Sons, major worldwide engraver of currency, postage stamps, stocks and bond certificates, based in England, currently a dormant company
- Waterlow Park, 26-acre (11 ha) park in the south east of Highgate Village, in North London
- Waterlow score (or Waterlow scale) gives an estimated risk for the development of a pressure sore in a given patient
- Waterloo (disambiguation)
