= Nursing Interventions Classification =

Classification system of nursing processes in United States

The Nursing Interventions Classification (NIC) is a care classification system which describes the activities that nurses perform as a part of the planning phase of the nursing process associated with the creation of a nursing care plan.

The NIC provides a four level hierarchy whose first two levels consists of a list of 433 different interventions, each with a definition in general terms, and then the ground-level list of a variable number of specific activities a nurse could perform to complete the intervention. The second two levels form a taxonomy in which each intervention is grouped into 27 classes, and each class is grouped into six domains.

An intent of this structure is to make it easier for a nurse to select an intervention for the situation, and to use a computer to describe the intervention in terms of standardized labels for classes and domains. Another intent is in each case to make it easy to use a Nursing Minimum Data Set (NMDS).

The terminology is an American Nurses' Association–recognized terminology, which is included in the UMLS, and is HL7 registered.

== See also ==
- Clinical Care Classification System
- Nursing Outcomes Classification
- NANDA
- Nursing care plan
- Nursing diagnosis
- Nursing process
- Nursing care
- Omaha System
