= Nursing Outcomes Classification =

System to evaluate the effects of nursing care

The Nursing Outcomes Classification (NOC) is a classification system which describes patient outcomes sensitive to nursing intervention. The NOC is a system to evaluate the effects of nursing care as a part of the nursing process. The NOC contains 330 outcomes, and each with a label, a definition, and a set of indicators and measures to determine achievement of the nursing outcome and are included The terminology is an American Nurses' Association-recognized terminology, is included in the UMLS, and is HL7 registered.

With the development of advanced nursing practice and the need to demonstrate effectiveness in patient care, academics and advanced practitioners have started researching and identifying nursing-sensitive outcome. These are defined as defined as an individual's, family or community state, behaviour or perception that is measured along a continuum in response to nursing intervention. Nursing sensitive outcomes have been identifying in rheumatology nursing, paediatric nursing and in intensive care.

== See also ==
- Clinical Care Classification System
- Diagnosis-related group
- NANDA
- Nursing care plan
- Nursing diagnosis
- Nursing Interventions Classification
- Nursing process
- Omaha System
