= Levine's conservation model for nursing =

The conservation model is a model of nursing education that was created by Myra Levine in 1989.

Levine postulated four main principles that the nurse follow to facilitate healing a patient. They are conserving the patient's:

- Energy
- Structural integrity
- Personal integrity
- Social integrity

The conservation model of nursing is based around the law of conservation of energy, combined with the psycho-social aspects of the individual's needs. Levine believed that these needs are joined within the individual as a "cascade of life events, churning and changing as the environmental challenge is confronted and resolved in each individual’s unique way.

The nurse as caregiver becomes part of the patient's environment, bringing to every nursing opportunity his or her own skill, knowledge, and compassion. It is shared enterprise and each participant is rewarded.”

It is not clear what extent Levine's ideas have been adopted, but critics suggest that her model focuses too heavily on the patient's current needs and desires, to the detriment of their longer term medical treatment.

== Background ==
Levine's objective was to find a new and effective method for teaching nursing degree students major concepts and patient care. She wanted her students to provide individualized and responsive patient care, that was less focused on medical procedures, and more on the individual patient's context. This led to the creation of a new nursing theory and approach to patient care.

The main focus of Levine's Conservation Model is to promote the physical and emotional well being of a patient, by addressing the four areas of conservation she set out. By aiming to address the conservation of energy, structure, and personal and social integrity, Levine's model helps guide nurses in provision of care that will help support the client's health. Though conservation of physical and emotional well being is the most vital part of attaining a successful outcome for patients, two additional concepts, adaptation and wholeness, are also extremely important in a patient's health;

- Adaptation- how a patient adapts to the realities of their new health situation- the better a patient can adapt to changes in health, the better they are able to respond to treatment and care.
- Wholeness - maintains that a nurse must strive to address the client's external and internal environments. This allows the client to be viewed as a whole person, and not just an illness.
- Conservation - describes the way complex systems are able to continue to function even when severely challenged”. Conservation allows individuals to effectively respond to the changes their body faces, while maintaining their uniqueness as a person.

== Key Concepts of the Conservation Model ==
The central concept of Levine's theory is conservation. When a person is in a state of conservation, it means that individual has been able to effectively adapt to the health challenges, with the least amount of effort.

Myra Levine described the Four Conservation Principles. These principles focus on conserving an individual's wholeness:

- Conservation of energy: Making sure the client does not expend too much energy, through rest and exercise.
  - Example: Making sure one's client gets enough sleep and balanced nutrition.
- Conservation of structural integrity: Doing activities or tasks that will aid in the client's physical healing
  - Example: Helping the client stay active and promoting good personal care.
- Conservation of personal integrity: Helping clients maintain uniqueness and individuality
  - Example: Giving clients choice in how to receive care.
- Conservation of social integrity: Assisting the patient in maintaining social and community ties will increase their support system during their time in hospital, and will also help the client's sense of self-worth.
  - Example: Making a pastor available to maintain religious ties during hospitalization.

== Nursing Process Using Levine’s Model ==
Levine's Conservation Model Diagram

1. Assessment- The collection of facts, by way of interviews and observation with the patient (considering conservation principles)
2. Judgement (Trophicognosis)- The application of nursing diagnoses which will provide the collected facts with meaning in the context of the patient's circumstance
3. Hypotheses- The application of interventions that aim to maintain the patient's wholeness and promote their adaptation in the current situation
4. Interventions- The use of interventions will test the nurse's hypotheses
5. Evaluation- Assessment of the client's responses to imposed interventions.

== Application of the Nursing Process in Levine’s Conservation Model ==
Assessment- The nurse will observe and speak with the patient, in conjunction with medical reports, results and diagnostic studies to gather information- referred to as the collection of provocative facts.

Patients will be assessed for challenges to their external and internal environments that may impede their ability to achieve complete wellness and health. Areas focused on which may present such challenges are:

- Energy Conservation- the balance between energy expenditure and the client's energy supply
- Structural Integrity- the defense system for the body
- Personal Integrity- the client's sense of self-worth, independence and validation
- Social Integrity- how well one can be part of a social system (family, community, etc.)

Judgement- Taking the provocative facts of the client's situation and organizing them in a way that makes sense and adds meaning to the patient's circumstances, in order to decide patient needs and possible nursing interventions. Using these judgments to decide about a patient's needs is referred to as trophicognosis.

Hypotheses- Using his or her formed judgment, the nurse will speak with the client regarding these judgments with the client. Hypothesizing about the problem and its solution will eventually form a care plan for the patient.

Interventions- With the aim of promoting wholeness and adaptation, the nurse tests his/her hypothesis via direct care. These interventions aim to address the four areas of wellness (energy conservation, structural integrity, personal integrity and social integrity).

Evaluation- Evaluation of the interventions aimed at supporting the nurse's hypotheses seek to assess the client's response to the interventions. The evaluation considers both supportive outcomes (providing comfort to the client) and therapeutic outcomes (improving the client's sense of wellness).

== Limitations ==
Due to the fact that the Conventional Model primary focus is on the individual and their wholeness measured by one's personal and emotional well being during a specific period of time, it has been contested that this model is not the best suited when it comes to addressing one's illness in the long term.

Thus, the conventions that Levine imposes on nursing students are more driven towards a patient's satisfaction in their current state without looking to future conditions. In addition, satisfying only current conditions does not allow room for nurses to attempt to prevent illness if following this specific model as they are concentrated more on the individual than the illness.
