= Readiness for enhanced spiritual well-being =

Nursing diagnosis

The nursing diagnosis readiness for enhanced spiritual well-being is defined as an "ability to experience and integrate meaning and purpose in life through a person's connectedness with self, others, art, music, literature, nature, or a power greater than oneself." (Anonymous, 2002, p. 68) and was approved by NANDA in 2002.

== Defining characteristics ==
A person with this diagnosis may:

- Having an enhanced desire for hope;
- Feel that there is meaning and purpose to their life;
- Have a sense of peace or serenity;
- Surrender love;
- Be forgiving towards themself, and request forgiveness of others;
- Have a satisfying philosophy of life;
- Experience joy, courage, or heightened coping;
- Pray or meditate;
- Connect with others;
- Provide service to others;
- Experience connections with nature;
- Experience connections with or a desire to create art, music, or literature, particularly of a religious or spiritual nature;
- Experience a connection with a power greater than oneself;
- Report mystical experiences;
- Participate in religious activities.

== Sources ==
- Anonymous (2002). Diagnosis Review Committee: New and revised diagnoses. Nursing Diagnosis 13(2) p. 68-71. Philadelphia:NANDA
