= Myra Estrin Levine =

American nurse and theorist (1920–1996)

- Born: Myra Estrin; December 12, 1920; Chicago, Illinois
- Died: March 20, 1996 (aged 75); Evanston, Illinois
- Occupations: Nurse, author, Theorist
- Known for: Conservation model of Nursing, Nursing theorist

Myra Estrin Levine (December 12, 1920, Chicago, Illinois – March 20, 1996, Evanston, Illinois) was an American nurse, theorist, author, and researcher. She is known for creating the Conservation Model of nursing.

== Biography ==
=== Early life ===
Myra was born in Chicago, Illinois on Sunday, December 12, 1920. She was the surviving child of a pair of twin girls and the oldest of three children. Her parents were Julius Jay, who was the owner of a hardware store, and Celia Bluma Estrin. Growing up, her father suffered from chronic gastrointestinal problems, these health issues eventually became one of Myra's motivations to study health care sciences.

=== Education ===
In 1938, she entered the University of Chicago on a scholarship. However, after two years, she changed her university due to financial problems. From 1940 to 1944, she entered Cook County Hospital School of Nursing. In 1949, she obtained her Bachelor of Science in Nursing from the University of Chicago. In 1962, she got her Master of Science from Wayne University.

=== Career ===
==== Nursing positions ====
During 1944, she worked as a private duty nurse. One year later, she worked as a civilian nurse in the US Army. From 1947 to 1950 she was a preclinical instructor of Physical Sciences for Nurses at Cook County Hospital School of Nursing. From 1950 to 1951, she was the director of Drexel Home for Older Adults in Chicago. From 1951 to 1952, she was the surgical supervisor at both the University of Chicago clinics, a position that she held again at the Henry Ford Hospital in Detroit from 1956 until 1962.

==== Academic positions ====
In the next years, she was an academic in four schools of nursing in Chicago: Cook County School of Nursing (1963–1967), Loyola University (1967–1973), Rush University (1974–1977) and the University of Illinois (1962–1963, 1977–1987). In 1987, she was made Professor Emerita of medical and surgical nursing at the University of Illinois. She was also a visiting professor at two nursing schools in Israel. One was at the Ben Gurion University of the Negev and the other was Tel Aviv University.

=== Awards ===
She received an honorary doctorate (Dr. of Humane Letters) in 1991 from Loyola University in Chicago. In 1977, she became the first person to receive the Sigma Theta Tau Elizabeth Russell Belford excellence in teaching award. She received recognition from the Alpha Lambda Chapter of Sigma Theta Tau in 1990 for her exceptional contribution to nursing. Levine was also made an honorary member of the American mental health aid to Israel in 1976. She received the American Journal of the Year for the first and second editions of her book Introduction of Clinical Nursing in 1969 and 1973.

=== Personal life ===
In 1944, she married Edwin Burton Levine, a classics scholar who was serving in the Army. Myra lost her first child, Benjamin, who only lived three days. She also had two other children. She was an active member of the Illinois Nurses' Association. Myra Estrin Levine retired in 1987 but remained active in the academic environment of Nursing.

== Books ==
Some of the books that she published were:

- Introduction to clinical nursing (1969)
- Renewal for nursing (1971)
- Levine's conservation model : a framework for nursing practice (1991).
