= International Journal of Nursing Knowledge =

- Discipline: Nursing
- Language: English
- Edited by: Jane Flanagan

Publication details
- Former name(s): International Journal of Nursing Terminologies & Classifications
- History: 1990-present
- Publisher: Wiley-Blackwell on behalf of NANDA
- Frequency: Quarterly

Standard abbreviations
- ISO 4: Int. J. Nurs. Knowl.

Indexing
- ISSN: 1541-5147 (print); 1744-618X (web)
- OCLC no.: 56943750

Links
- Journal homepage; Online access; Online archive

The International Journal of Nursing Knowledge is a peer-reviewed nursing journal for standardized nursing languages and their applications. It is the official publication of NANDA.

== Abstracting and indexing ==
The journal is abstracted and indexed by Academic Search Premier, CINAHL, Index Medicus/MEDLINE, PubMed, ProQuest, and Scopus.
