= Barbara Braden =

American medical researcher

- Born: November 7, 1943; North Platte, Nebraska, U.S.
- Died: June 24, 2023 (aged 79); Omaha, Nebraska, U.S.
- Occupations: Nurse, nursing educator, college administrator, medical researcher
- Known for: Braden Scale for Predicting Pressure Ulcer Risk

Barbara J. Braden (November 7, 1943 – June 24, 2023) was an American nurse, nurse educator, college administrator, and medical researcher. She was co-developer of the Braden Scale for Predicting Pressure Ulcer Risk, and held several administrative positions at Creighton University, including dean of the Graduate School from 1995 to 2006, and dean of the College of Professional Studies from 2002 to 2011. She was inducted into the Nebraska Nursing Hall of Fame.

== Early life and education ==
Braden was born in North Platte, Nebraska, the daughter of William Braden and Norene Klosen Braden (later Duggan). Her father died in Germany during World War II, and she was raised by her widowed mother on her grandparents' farm near Stapleton, Nebraska, and in Griswold, Iowa after her mother remarried. She graduated from Mount Loretto High School in Council Bluffs, Iowa. She trained as a nurse at St. Joseph's School of Nursing in Omaha, graduated from Creighton University with a bachelor's degree in nursing in 1973, and earned a master's degree in nursing from the University of California, San Francisco in 1975. She completed doctoral studies at the University of Texas at Austin in 1988.

== Career ==
At Creighton University, Braden was a professor of medical surgical nursing. She was dean of the Graduate School from 1995 to 2006, interim academic vice president in 2002, and dean of the College of Professional Studies from 2002 until her retirement in 2011. She received the College of Nursing Alumni Merit Award in 1989, the Distinguished Administrator Service Award in 2008, and the Alumni Achievement Citation in 2013.

As part of her dissertation research, Braden and Nancy Bergstrom developed the Braden Scale for Predicting Pressure Ulcer Risk in 1987, an assessment tool which was soon widely used in healthcare facilities, including hospitals and nursing homes. She founded a company, Prevention Plus, for marketing educational and support materials related to use of the Braden Scale.

Braden was a fellow of the American Academy of Nursing. She was inducted into the Nebraska Nursing Hall of Fame. In 1991, she was named a "Woman of Distinction" by the Omaha YWCA. In 2001, she received a lifetime achievement award from European Pressure Ulcer Advisory Panel. She served on the boards of the Madonna Rehabilitation Hospitals and the Nebraska AIDS Project.

== Publications ==
- "A Conceptual Schema for the Study of the Etiology of Pressure Sores" (1987, with Nancy Bergstrom)
- "A Clinical Trial of the Braden Scale for Predicting Pressure Sore Risk" (1987, with Nancy Bergstrom and Pamela J. Demuth)
- "Clinical Utility of the Braden Scale for Predicting Pressure Sore Risk" (1989, with Nancy Bergstrom)
- "A Prospective Study of Pressure Sore Risk among Institutionalized Elderly" (1992, with Nancy Bergstrom)
- Predictive validity of the Braden scale for pressure sore risk in a nursing home population" (1994, with Nancy Bergstrom)
- "Predicting Pressure Ulcer Risk: A Multisite Study of the Predictive Validity of the Braden Scale" (1998, with Nancy Bergstrom, Mildred Kemp, Mary Champagne, and Elizabeth Ruby)
- "How and Why to Do Pressure Ulcer Risk Assessment" (2002, with Elizabeth A. Ayello)
- "Predictive Validity of the Braden Scale Among Black and White Subjects" (2002, with Nancy Bergstrom)
- "Preventing Pressure Ulcers with the Braden Scale: An update on this easy-to-use tool that assesses a patient’s risk" (2005, with Joann Maklebust)
- "The Braden Scale for Predicting Pressure Sore Risk: Reflections after 25 Years" (2012)

== Personal life ==
Braden married Erin Wetzel in 2019. She died in 2023, at the age of 79, from brain cancer.
