= National Minimum Data Set for Social Care =

- Owner: Skills for Care
- URL: www.skillsforcare.org.uk/nmds-sc
- Launched: October 2005

The National Minimum Data Set for Social Care (NMDS-SC) gathers information about the social care workforce to help employers with workforce planning in England. It also provides sector wide workforce intelligence to support strategic planning in the wider social care sector. In challenging economic times, shifting government policy and changing expectations of those needing care and support are altering the way the social care sector operates. The aim of the NMDS-SC is to provide workforce intelligence relied upon by government, strategic bodies, employers and individuals to make decisions that will improve outcomes for people who use services.

The NMDS-SC was developed from 2003 to 2005 by Dr Francis Ward (King's College London) who conceived the idea and managed it to fruition as Head of Skills Research & Intelligence at Skills for Care working in partnership with the Department of Health, the Department for Education & Skills (now the Department for Children, Schools and Families), the General Social Care Council (GSCC), the Commission for Social Care Inspection (CSCI), the Social Care Institute for Excellence (SCIE), National Health Service (NHS) National Workforce Projects, the Local Government Association (LGA), the Learning & Skills Council (LSC) and other key stakeholders.

National Minimum Data Set for Social Care (NMDS-SC) was replaced by the Adult Social Care (ASC) Workforce Data Set in August 2019.

== Function ==
The National Minimum Data Set for Social Care (NMDS-SC) is a web-based system that gathers information about the adult social care workforce. Employers from all areas of the sector including the independent and statutory sector can register and update their information. The NMDS-SC is collected online.

Skills for Care and government bodies use this anonymised information about the workforce to inform government policy and funding. The NMDS-SC also helps local authorities to develop a greater knowledge of the workforce and service providers in local areas.

Organisations can input into NMDS-SC and update their organisational and staff details as frequently as they wish. The more up to date the information is within the system, the more accurate and timely the reports produced by the system can be. Completion of the NMDS-SC is not mandatory and all data submitted is done voluntarily by employers.

== See also ==
- Minimum Data Set (MDS), US
- National minimum dataset, in health informatics
- Nursing Minimum Data Set (NMDS), US
