= Ida Jean Orlando =

American nurse

Ida Jean Orlando (August 12, 1926 – November 28, 2007) was an American nurse whose theory has significant relevance for nursing in many countries worldwide.

Orlando graduated as a nurse from New York Medical College in 1947. She later obtained a Bachelor's degree in Public Health Nursing from St. John's University, Brooklyn, in 1951, and a Master's degree in Mental Health Nursing from Teachers College, Columbia University, New York City, in 1954. She served as a professor at the Yale School of Nursing with a focus on psychiatry until her retirement.

Ida Orlando is the originator of the nursing process, which is part of the curriculum for nursing as well as social and healthcare programs in many countries. Her theory can serve as the foundation for the care provided in hospitals and home care settings.

In 1961, Orlando published the book The Dynamic Nurse-Patient Relationship, based on her own observations. The book deals with participant studies on the interaction between nurses and patients.
