= Armed Forces Health Longitudinal Technology Application =

AHLTA is a global Electronic Health Record (EHR) system used by U.S. Department of Defense (DoD). It was implemented at Army, Navy and Air Force Military Treatment Facilities (MTF) around the world between January 2003 and January 2006. It is a services-wide medical and dental information management system. What made AHLTA unique was its implementation date (early EHR adoption), its Central Data Repository, its use in operational medicine and its global implementation. There is nothing like it in the private sector. (According to the DoD, "AHLTA" was never an acronym, but is rather the system's only name.)

AHLTA is an Electronic Health Record which was built to supplement the functionality in the Composite Health Care System (CHCS). CHCS is a practice management system (scheduling and finance) with Computerized Provider Order Entry. AHLTA allows providers to document clinical notes, place orders and select coding (ICD/CPT). Additionally, it provides secure online access to all Military Health System (MHS) beneficiaries records for nurses, corpsmen, medics, technicians, clerks and various office managers. The system links the U.S. military's 481 medical treatment facilities (MTFs) (including those deployed abroad) to the EHR, ultimately supporting 9.2 million MHS beneficiaries. It is the first system to allow for the central storage of standardized EHR data that is available for worldwide sharing of patient information. In addition, it provided data sharing between the VA and the DoD through a module called BiDirectional Health Information Exchange (BHIE).

Since 2010, multiple improvements have been attempted to the base software correcting defects and adding new software modules. Version 3.3.8 included the ability to support ICD-10, and all prior versions of AHLTA were phased out. However, DoD health professionals continued to find AHLTA to be difficult to use, slow, and frequently subject to crashing, and in 2013 DoD began taking bids for a $4.3 billion, 10-year contract to overhaul the system. In July 2015, DoD awarded the contract to the Leidos Partnership for Defense Health, a consortium of EHR manager Cerner; management consulting and professional services company Accenture Federal Services; and engineering and technical government contractor Leidos.

== History ==
The development of AHLTA is directly related to a Presidential Directive issued in 1997. The Directive focused on and reinforced the need for a centralized, longitudinal patient record for military personnel accessible across the DoD enterprise. AHLTA, previously known as the Composite Health Care System II, was developed by the Clinical Information Technology Program Office (CITPO), an acquisitions office for centrally managed MHS clinical information technology systems supporting the U.S. military. (In 2008, CITPO was combined with the TMIP-J Program Office to form the Defense Health Information Management System, or DHIMS.) It began worldwide deployment in January 2004. Unique to AHLTA was the entry of more than 2 years of historical health information for each beneficiary upon the creation of their EHR. This information, transferred from legacy systems, facilitated continuity of care.

AHLTA has been deployed in Phases, or "Blocks", of increasing functionality that allows the MHS to build a system that is easily adapted to meet evolving requirements and to incorporate the latest available technology. Block 1 provided the foundation of system: performance through a graphical user interface for real-time ambulatory encounter documentation. It enabled retrieval of a beneficiary's health record at the point of care. By December 2006, Block 1 had been fully deployed and was in use by more than 55,000 MHS care providers in 481 Army, Navy and Air Force treatment facilities worldwide, including Combat Support Hospitals and Battalion Aid Stations in the combat zones of Iraq and Afghanistan. Block 2 (AHLTA version 3.3) was released in December 2008 and integrated robust dental documentation and optometry orders management capabilities (the Spectacles Request Tracking System, or SRTS). Version 3.3.3.X with client update 9.1 is currently fielded to physician and clinic staff workstations.

The original plan was to phase in replacements for the CHCS Ancillary modules. However, these blocks of AHLTA were defunded. Subsequent blocks will modernize legacy system ancillary services (laboratory, pharmacy, and radiology), order entry and results retrieval, inpatient documentation, and interface exchange with other MHS information support systems.

== Operations ==
Master Patient Indexing is a feature of the AHLTA Clinical Data Repository (CDR). Over 100 CHCS host systems, DEERS (the Defense Enrollment Eligibility Reporting System), and AHLTA-Theater (the version being used in Iraq and other areas) all contributed patients into the CDR when it was created from 25 months of data pulls back in 2004. Each CHCS patient registration links into AHLTA, some link to existing patients, but others are newly created. Complexity with patient names and methods of identifying them with other demographics can lead to duplication, both in a local CHCS system and in the central AHLTA CDR. There is currently a DHIMS contract aimed at improving the processes and automating the routines to resolve duplicate patients and prevent their creation in the future.

== AHLTA Characteristics ==
- Creates a lifelong medical record for TRICARE beneficiaries
- Offers an intuitive, graphical user interface designed by military providers to support clinical workflow
- Leverages structured documentation to maintain integrity of patient data and optimize data standardization
- Enables symptom-based medical surveillance
- Uses templates to simplify workflow
- Provides 24-hour, 7-day-a-week access to beneficiary EMR (assuming the network is working)
- Eliminates health record legibility issues
- Enables population health and wellness reporting
- Provides clinical functionality used in support of deployed service members, ensuring a "train as we fight" approach
- Ensures costly tests, labs and scans are not lost and needlessly duplicated
- Interoperability ensures records can be accessed at any MTF worldwide
- Prevents unauthorized access and protects from loss due to natural or man-made disasters

== Criticism ==
AHLTA has been poorly received in some quarters. Described by some as "difficult to use", the Army's Surgeon General stated that clinicians "spend as much or more time working around the system as they do with the system". (Some military medical insiders facetiously attribute the phrase "Aw, hell! Let's try again!" to the acronym.) Current providers using AHLTA have become excellent at multi-tasking while using the application as it routinely takes 30sec-1min to load up each new tab that is requested. In 2017 insiders are still astounded that such a poorly designed and functioning system is allowed to remain. Most have given up and accepted that using AHLTA makes a 5min task take 10-20min.

One problem with AHLTA is that many service members data are not captured and recorded (therefore lost), when the patient is referred to outside (non-DOD) civilian providers for care. The care from outside providers could be captured and incorporated into AHLTA from Tricare via billing codes and records, but it is not. Almost all health data recordings are missing from AHLTA once a referral to an outside provider is made. This represents an enormous amount of relevant medical data on service members missing from AHLTA and a significant limitation of the system.
