= Teaching clinic =

A teaching clinic is an outpatient clinic that provides health care for ambulatory patients - as opposed to inpatients treated in a hospital. Teaching clinics traditionally are operated by educational facilities and provide free or low-cost services to patients.

Teaching clinics differ from standard health clinics in that treatment is performed by graduate students under the supervision of licensed health care providers or by licensed health care providers while graduate students observe.

Teaching clinics serve the dual purpose of providing a setting for students in the health care profession to learn and practice skills, while simultaneously offering lower cost treatments to patients.

== Patients ==
In some instances, patient groups may be based in part upon a paradigm in which friends and family are commonly recruited to be patients.

== See also ==
- Teaching hospital
