= ABC Codes =

Codes to identify medical procedures and supplies

Alternative Billing Concepts code (ABC Codes) are five-digit alpha codes (e.g., AAAAA) used by licensed and non-licensed healthcare practitioners to supplement medical codes (e.g. CPT and HCPCS II) on standard electronic (e.g. American National Standards Institute, Accredited Standards Committee X12 N 837P healthcare claims and on standard paper claims (e.g., CMS 1500 Form) to describe services, remedies and/or supply items provided and/or used during patient visits. ABC codes contain both a short description (e.g. 80 characters or less) and an expanded definition of the service, remedy and/or supply item.

ABC codes fill gaps in healthcare administrative coding that conventional medical code sets do not cover and support preferred provider contracting, claims, payments and comparative outcome studies. Additionally, ABC codes are tied to state legislative references regarding scope of practice and training requirements on a code, state and practitioner-specific basis.
