= Gordon's functional health patterns =

Method of comprehensive nursing assessment

Gordon’s functional health patterns is a method devised by Marjory Gordon to be used by nurses in the nursing process to provide a more comprehensive nursing assessment of the patient.

The following areas are assessed through questions asked by the nurse and medical examinations to provide an overview of the individual's health status and health practices that are used to reach the current level of health or wellness.

- Health Perception and Management
- Nutritional metabolic
- Elimination-excretion patterns and problems need to be evaluated (constipation, incontinence, diarrhea)
- Activity exercise-whether one is able to do daily activities normally without any problem, self care activities
- Sleep rest-do they have hypersomnia, insomnia, do they have normal sleeping patterns
- Cognitive-perceptual-assessment of neurological function is done to assess, check the person's ability to comprehend information
- Self perception/self concept
- Role relationship—This pattern should only be used if it is appropriate for the patient's age and specific situation.
- Sexual reproductivity
- Coping-stress tolerance
- Value-Belief Pattern
