= Clinical Information Technology Program Office =

The Clinical Information Technology Program Office (CITPO) is an acquisition office for centrally managed Military Health System (MHS) clinical information technology systems that support the delivery of health services throughout the MHS. CITPO is staffed by members of the Armed Services' medical departments and a government civilian workforce, working together as a matrixed organization to meet project goals and objectives.

In May, 2008 CITPO was combined with the TMIP-J Program Office to form Defense Health Information Management System (DHIMS)
