= Morning care =

Hygiene routine

Morning care is a hygiene routine provided by personal support workers, nursing assistants, nurses, and other workers for patients and residents of care facilities each morning. The care routine typically includes washing the face, combing hair, shaving, putting on cosmetics, toileting, getting dressed, and similar activities. Nurses may also check the patients' temperature, check medical equipment, replenish IV bags, change dressings, or do other daily or semi-daily tasks at this time.

Most morning care duties are basic activities of daily living. Different people require different levels of support for morning care, depending on their performance status. Some people may be able to complete morning care with little or no support from healthcare workers, while others may require the worker to perform all the tasks completely.

Patient preferences may dictate aspects of morning care, such as the order of tasks done, the type of soap used, or whether bathing is a morning or afternoon activity.

Some basic housekeeping, such as changing bedsheets, may be done at the same time.
