= Braden Scale for Predicting Pressure Ulcer Risk =

Clinical tool

- Purpose: assess risk of pressure ulcer

The Braden Scale for Predicting Pressure Ulcer Risk, is a tool that was developed in 1987 by Barbara Braden and Nancy Bergstrom. The purpose of the scale is to help health professionals, especially nurses, assess a patient's risk of developing a pressure ulcer.

== Assessment using the Braden Scale ==
The Braden Scale assesses a patient's risk of developing a pressure ulcer by examining six criteria:

=== Sensory perception ===
This parameter measures a patient's ability to detect and respond to discomfort or pain that is related to pressure on parts of their body. The ability to sense pain itself plays into this category, as does the level of consciousness of a patient and therefore their ability to cognitively react to pressure-related discomfort.

=== Moisture ===
Excessive and continuous skin moisture can pose a risk to compromise the integrity of the skin by causing the skin tissue to become macerated and therefore be at risk for epidermal erosion. So this category assesses the degree of moisture the skin is exposed to.

=== Activity ===
This category looks at a patient's level of physical activity since very little or no activity can encourage atrophy of muscles and breakdown of tissue.

=== Mobility ===
This category looks at the capability of a patient to adjust their body position independently. This assesses the physical competency to move and can involve the clients willingness to move.

=== Nutrition ===
The assessment of a client's nutritional status looks at their normal patterns of daily nutrition. Eating only portions of meals or having imbalanced nutrition can indicate a high risk in this category.

=== Friction and Shear ===
Friction and shear looks at the amount of assistance a client needs to move and the degree of sliding on beds or chairs that they experience. This category is assessed because the sliding motion can cause shear which means the skin and bone are moving in opposite directions causing breakdown of cell membranes and capillaries. Moisture enhances the susceptibility of friction.

== Scoring with the Braden Scale ==
Each category is rated on a scale of 1 to 4, excluding the 'friction and shear' category which is rated on a 1–3 scale. This combines for a possible total of 23 points, with a higher score meaning a lower risk of developing a pressure ulcer and vice versa. A score of 23 means there is no risk for developing a pressure ulcer while the lowest possible score of 6 points represents the severest risk for developing a pressure ulcer. The Braden Scale assessment score scale:

- Very High Risk: Total Score 9 or less
- High Risk: Total Score 10–12
- Moderate Risk: Total Score 13–14
- Mild Risk: Total Score 15–18
- No Risk: Total Score 19–23

== See also ==
- Pressure ulcer
- Wound healing
- Waterlow score
