= Clinical Care Classification System =

Classification of elements of nursing practices

The Clinical Care Classification (CCC) System is a standardized, coded nursing terminology that identifies the discrete elements of nursing practice. The CCC provides a unique framework and coding structure. Used for documenting the plan of care; following the nursing process in all health care settings.

The Clinical Care Classification (CCC), previously the Home Health Care Classification (HHCC), was originally created to document nursing care in home health and ambulatory care settings. Specifically designed for clinical information systems, the CCC facilitates nursing documentation at the point-of-care. The CCC was developed empirically through the examination of approximately 40,000 textual phrases representing nursing diagnoses/patient problems, and 72,000 phrases depicting patient care services and/or actions. The use of the CCC has expanded into other settings, and it is claimed to be appropriate for multidisciplinary documentation.

The CCC, capturing the essence of patient care, consists of two interrelated terminologies – the CCC of Nursing Diagnoses & Outcomes and the CCC of Nursing Interventions & and Actions – classified by 21 Care Components that link the two together. This merge enables a roadmap to other health-related classification systems.

The Clinical Care Classification (CCC) System is an American Nurses Association (ANA)-recognized comprehensive, coded, nursing terminology standard. In 2007, the CCC was accepted by the Department of Health and Human Services as the first national nursing terminology. The computable structure of the CCC System allows nurses, allied health professionals, and researchers to determine; care needs (resources), workload (productivity), and outcomes (quality).

== History ==
In 1988 to 1990, Harriet Werley established the Nursing Minimum Data Set, which consisted of 12 variables: 8 variables focused on patient demographics and the remaining 4 focused on nursing practice. These were (a) nursing diagnoses, (b) nursing interventions, (c) nursing outcomes, and (d) nursing intensity. The Nursing Minimum Data Set became the basis for the nursing classification standards recognized by the ANA. In 1990, the CCAIN was renamed the Database Steering Committee.

In 1991, the Database Steering Committee submitted to the Congress on Nursing Practice a resolution that NI be adopted as a new nursing specialty. This submission which was accepted, leading to the development of the Nursing Informatics: Scope and Standards of Practice and the certification of NI specialists. In 1992, the Database Steering Committee developed the criteria, recognizing the first 4 of 12 nursing classifications/terminologies. One being the CCC System. Previously known as the Home Health Care Classification System, as nursing standards for the documentation of nursing practice using computer technology systems. The ANA subsequently submitted the four of six classifications/terminologies to the National Library of Medicine for input into its developing Unified Medical Language System's (UMLS) Metathesaurus.

In 2006, President George W. Bush issued an Executive Order (No. 13410) that every person in the country should have an EHR by 2014. In 2007/2008, the Healthcare Information Technology Standards Panel selected and recommended the Clinical Care Classification (CCC) System as the first national nursing terminology inter operable for the exchange of information among HIT systems. The CCC System was one of the standards in the first set of 55 national standards approved for use in the EHR, by the Department of Health and Human Services (AHIC, 2006) and the only national nursing terminology standard.

In 2020, HCA Healthcare became the new custodian of Dr. Virginia Saba's Clinical Care Classification (CCC) System.

== Major features ==
- Consists of discrete atomic-level concepts using qualifiers to enhance and expand the concepts.
- Data are collected once and used many times for many purposes including efficient aggregation.
- Copyrighted and in the public domain; available with permission without any cost or license.
- Specifically designed for electronic health records (EHRs) and healthcare information technology (HIT) systems as well as other electronic information processing systems.
- Tested and applicable in ALL healthcare settings.
- Conforms to Cimino (1998) criteria for a standardized healthcare terminology.
- Coded standardized framework for electronic documentation, retrieval, and analysis.
- Codes based on ICD-10 (WHO, 1992) structure for information exchange promoting interoperability.
- Uses a coding structure of five alphanumeric digits to link the two CCC System terminologies to each other and to map to other EHR/HIT systems.
- Designed for determining workload (productivity), resources (needs), outcomes (quality), and care costs.
- Concept terminology with online source files so public and private organizations may harmonize nursing information formats for cross-organizational sharing of information.
- Facilitates the electronic documentation of patient care at the point of care.
- Uses a framework of care components to classify the two CCC System terminologies and represent 4 healthcare patterns focusing on a holistic approach to patient care.
- Consists of flexible, adaptable, and expandable concepts/data elements.

== The CCC Model ==
The CCC Model depicts the documentation of patient care by nurses and allied health providers in any health care setting as an interactive, interrelated, and continuous feedback process. The CCC Model illustrates the relationship between the CCC of Nursing Diagnoses and Outcomes and the CCC of Nursing Interventions and Actions. The arrows are bi-directional indicating the continual flow and feedback among the three major concepts:

- Nursing Diagnoses
- Interventions
- Outcomes.

== System framework ==
- Components:

A nursing care component is defined as a cluster of elements that represents a unique pattern of clinical care nursing practice; namely, Health Behavioral, Functional, Physiological, and Psychological.

- Nursing Diagnoses:

A clinical judgment about the healthcare consumer's response to actual or potential health conditions or needs. The diagnosis provides the basis for determination of a plan to achieve expected outcomes. Registered nurses utilize nursing and medical diagnoses depending upon education and clinical preparation and legal authority."

- Nursing Interventions:

A nursing intervention is defined as a single nursing action – treatment, procedure or activity – designed to achieve an outcome to a diagnosis, nursing or medical, for which the nurse is accountable.
Patient services are usually initiated as medical orders by a referring physician and reviewed by the admitting nurse. As part of the admission assessment the primary nurse also determines the nursing orders based on the signs and symptoms, diagnoses, and expected outcomes/goals; and together, form the plan of care that requires the nursing interventions following the nursing process.

- Nursing Outcomes:

The CCC of Nursing Outcomes Version 2.5 consists of 528 concepts derived from the three qualifiers used to modify the 176 Nursing Diagnoses: Improve(d), Stabilize(d), or Deteriorate(d). These three qualifiers depict the Expected Outcomes and Actual Outcomes – totaling 528 nursing outcome concepts. The Expected Outcomes represent the goal of patient care in future tense as Will: Improve, Stabilize, or Deteriorate whereas the Actual Outcomes represent whether the goals were met or not met using the qualifiers in the past tense as Improved, Stabilized, or Deteriorated.

The CCC System consists of discrete atomic-level data elements that encompasses nursing diagnoses, interventions, and outcomes. The CCC is a nursing terminology specifically developed for computerization: e.g. electronic healthcare information systems (EHR), computer-based patient records (CPR), and Clinical Information Systems (CIS), from research which collected live patient care data. The CCC System describes the six steps of the nursing process:

- Assessment
- Diagnosis
- Outcome Identification
- Planning
- Implementation
- Evaluation

The nursing process is the standard of professional nursing practice recognized by the ANA for clinical decision making in a coded, standardized framework. The CCC supports the exchange of nursing information and makes available for data retrieval and analysis in the electronic health record and health information record systems databases specifically linking nursing diagnoses to nursing interventions to nursing outcomes.

- Open Architecture
- Specifically designed for computer-based systems – EHR, CIS, and PHR
- Tested and applicable in ALL healthcare settings.
- Atomic-Level Concepts
- Approved as an interoperable terminology by the American National Standards Institute (ANSI) Standards Development Organization (SDO) Health Level Seven (HL7®).
- Conforms to Cimino criteria for a standardized terminology
- Coded standardized framework for electronic documentation, retrieval & analysis
- Codes based on ICD structure for information exchange promoting interoperability
- Designed for determining care costs
- Integrated in the Metathesaurus of the Unified Medical Language System (UMLS) of the National Library of Medicine (NLM) and SNOMED CT
- Integrated in the Cumulative Index to Nursing and Allied Health Literature® (CINAHL)
- Used in the Clinical LOINC System for documenting diagnoses outcomes
- Tested as an international nursing standard based on the An Integrated Reference Terminology Model for Nursing approved by the International Organization for Standardization (ISO/TC 215:Health Informatics) in October 2003.
- Concept terminology with online source files so public and private organizations may harmonize nursing information formats for the cross organizational sharing of information.
- One of the contributed terminologies used as the basis for the original alpha version of the International Classification of Nursing Practice (ICNP®) developed by the International Council of Nurses (ICN).
- Indexed to the MEDCIN ® terminology through a contextual hierarchy to the full array of medical terminology standards and concepts with intelligent prompting (IP). The indexing allows for the presentation and documentation of relevant clinical symptoms, history, physical findings, and diagnoses to the CCC nursing terminology from the Current Procedural Terminology (CPT)®, Diagnostic and Statistical Manual of Mental Disorders (DSM-IV), ICD, LOINC®, RxNORM, SNOMED CT® and others for virtually any clinical condition.

The Clinical Care Classification System was developed from a research study conducted by Dr. Virginia K. Saba and a research team through a contract with the Health Care Financing Agency (HCFA), currently known as the Centers for Medicare and Medicaid Services (CMS). The objective was to develop a computerized method for assessing and classifying patients for the prediction of nursing resources needs and for evaluating the outcomes of care. "To accomplish this goal, data on actual resource use, that could objectively be measured, was collected and used to predict resource requirements" (Saba, 1995). The CCC System was developed from retrospective research data from 8,967 patient records from a sample of 800 organizations randomly stratified by staff size, type of ownership, and geographic location. The methodology was applied to a national sample of home health agencies that provided all services and products (Spradley & Dorsey, 1985). Dr. Saba and the research team analyzed and coded the research from 10,000 patient records from which the team obtained more than 70,000 statements focusing on nursing interventions and actions provided to patients. Also used were 40,000 diagnostic conditions and problems describing patient care needs.

The CCC System is a standardized framework consisting of four levels designed to allow nursing data to flow upward as well as downward. At the highest level the CCC System Framework consists of four healthcare patterns (Saba, 2007):

- Health Behavioral
- Functional
- Physiological
- Psychological

Each represents a different set of Care Components. The second level consists of the 21 Care Components which serve to classify the two terminologies and define as a cluster of elements that depict one of four healthcare patterns. The third level consists of:

- 182 nursing diagnosis concepts representing concrete patient problems
- 792 nursing interventions and actions (198 interventions each with one of 4 action types (assess, perform, teach, and manage) each depicting a unique single atomic-level concept

The fourth level is represented by the expected and actual outcomes 182 diagnoses each with one of three outcomes for Expected Outcome (Saba, 2007, p. 154):

- Improve or resolve patient's condition
- Stabilize or maintain patient's condition
- Support deterioration of patient's condition

And one of three outcomes for Actual Outcome:

- Improved or resolved patient's condition
- Stabilized or maintained patient's condition
- Deteriorated or died

The CCC System uses a five-character structure to code the two terminologies: (1) CCC of Nursing Diagnoses and Outcomes and (2) CCC of Nursing Interventions and Actions. The CCC coding structure is paced on the format of the International Statistical Classification of Diseases and Related Health Problems: Tenth Revision: Volume 1, WHO, 1992. The coding strategy for each terminology consists of the following (Saba, 2007): The graphic shows examples of the coding structure for a CCC diagnosis code and a CCC intervention code.

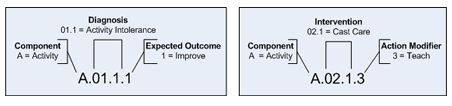
Illustration of CCC Code Structure

- First position: One alphabetic character code for Care Component (A to U);
- Second and Third positions: Two-digit code for a Core Concept (major category) followed by a decimal point;
- Fourth position: One-digit code for a subcategory, if available, followed by a decimal point;
- Fifth position: One-digit code for: one of three Expected or Actual Outcomes and /or; one of four Nursing Intervention Action Types.
- There are 4 CCC Action Types derived from the frequencies analyzed in the research study of 70,000 textual phrases described above.

The significance of the CCC is a nursing terminology that completes the missing link needed to address nursing contribution to healthcare quality. Nursing care may be the most critical factor in a patient's treatment and recovery. The partnership of nursing and technology is vital for designing nursing practice environments.

The benefit of the CCC is the ability to represent the essence of nursing care in health information systems and applications during any patient care, transfer or transition. The CCC supports the mandate of accrediting organizations to reconcile patient-centered information (The Joint Commission, 2011) and supports the informational exchange and data integrity requirements of CMS and the Office of the National Coordinator (ONC) for meaningful use when patient data is exchanged by using the Nurse Process recognized for professional nursing.

- Standardized professional documentation)
- Standardized data on nursing interventions for evidence-based practice and research
- Re-usable health data for cross-organization exchange comparisons
- Documented outcomes by nursing diagnoses
- Standardized quality outcomes comparisons by nursing intervention and action type

The computable structure of the Clinical Care Classification (CCC) System in the public domain (copyright permission) promotes the system upgrades of existing electronic healthcare information systems. The system architecture of the CCC offers a return on investment with discrete atomic-level data to describe the impact of nursing care on care quality, productivity (workload), resources (staffing), and outcomes management.

== Applied uses ==
Nursing Practice Applications:

- Capture patient care data using a standardized coded nursing terminology.
- Code electronic clinical encounters: diagnoses, interventions, and outcomes.
- Track nurses' contribution to patient care and care outcomes.
- Provide standardized concepts (data/elements) for clinical pathways and decision support.
- Enable evidence-based practice protocols to process and analyze patient care data and to evaluate the effects of nursing care on patient outcomes.

Nursing Education Applications:

- Teach students how to electronically document and code POCs based on the nursing process.
- Track student assignments: procedures and protocols.
- Test and evaluate online the clinical documentation of student's patient care.
- Teach and evaluate student use of simulations.
- Use Second Life to enhance educational experiences.
- Use the CCC System application to enhance nursing educational experiences.

Nursing Research Applications:

- Search online nursing literature for nursing ontology and the CCC System.
- Research the use of relative value units and the CCC of Nursing Interventions/action Types.
- Analyze and interpret nursing output in the EHR.
- Support research to advance NI science and knowledge.

Nursing Administration Applications:

- Capture standardized quality indicators and measures.
- Capture and measure the impact of care on outcomes.
- Determine and measure nursing workload, resources, and cost.
- Support the prediction of patient acuity and care needs.
