= Waterlow score =

Clinical tool

The Waterlow score (or Waterlow scale) gives an estimated risk for the development of a pressure sore in a given patient. The tool was developed in 1985 by clinical nurse teacher Judy Waterlow. It is available both on a two-sided score card and on an app.

== Scoring criteria ==
The following areas are assessed for each patient and assigned a point value.

- Build/weight for height
- Skin type/visual risk areas
- Sex and age
- Malnutrition Screening Tool
- Continence
- Mobility

Additional points in special risk categories are assigned to selected patients.

- Tissue malnutrition
- Neurological deficit
- Major surgery or trauma

Potential scores range from 1 to 64. A total Waterlow score ≥10 indicates risk for pressure ulcer. A high risk score is ≥15. A very high risk exists at scores ≥20. The reverse side of the Waterlow card lists examples of preventive aids and interventions.

== Criticism ==
While packaged conveniently as a laminated card, the score has received criticism owing to its large number of scored items. This, combined with a lack of operational definitions, may reduce its reliability.

== See also ==
- Pressure ulcer
- Wound healing
- Braden Scale for Predicting Pressure Ulcer Risk
