= Nursing assessment =

Gathering information about a patient

Nursing assessment is the gathering of information about a patient's physiological and psychological status by a licensed Registered Nurse. Nursing assessment is the first step in the nursing process. A section of the nursing assessment may be delegated to certified nurses aides. Vitals and EKG's may be delegated to certified nurses aides or nursing techs. (Nurse Journal, 2017) It differs from a medical diagnosis. In some instances, the nursing assessment is very broad in scope and in other cases it may focus on one body system or mental health. Nursing assessments are used to identify current and future patient care needs. They incorporate the recognition of normal versus abnormal body physiology. Prompt recognition of pertinent changes along with the critical thinking allows the nurse to identify and prioritize appropriate interventions. An assessment format may already be in place at certain facilities and during specific circumstances.

== The admission ==
When a patient is admitted to a facility or institution there are crucial pieces of information that must be gathered in preparation of providing good care and education. The information gathered includes the following:

- name, date, time, and sources of identification
- chief complaint and pain
- current status (vital signs, mental status, nutritional status)
- medical history
- valuables
- allergies
- rights and responsibilities
- risks
- any pertinent information that could be used by the other members of a health care team

== The client interview ==
The purpose of an interview is to collect subjective data from the client. Subjective data refers to what the patient says is being experienced. Nurses also collect objective data. In the interview, nurses gather some degree of data by observing things like posture, conversation skills, and their overall appearance and mood.

Prior to assessment, the nurse establishes a professional and therapeutic mode of communication in order to develop rapport and build a trusting, non-judgmental relationship. This foundation encourages the client to share personal information with greater comfort. Therapeutic communication is typically initiated by the nurse introducing themselves, inquiring how the client prefers to be addressed, and outlining the general nature of the topics to be covered. This exchange also provides an opportunity for the nurse to assess the patient's own perception of their health.

Communication within the interview encompasses both sending and receiving information, each occurring through verbal and nonverbal channels. Verbal communication consists of the explicit spoken content exchanged between parties. Nonverbal communication, including facial expressions, eye contact, body language, hand gestures, and use of personal space, is considered equally significant, as it often conveys meaning beyond conscious awareness and requires considerable self-regulation.

The types of questions employed during an interview are also important. Closed-ended questions elicit brief, constrained responses such as "yes," "no," or a selection from nurse-provided options, which limits the scope of the client's reply. Open-ended questions, by contrast, allow the client to respond freely and at length, facilitating fuller, more comprehensive expression and a more complete clinical picture.

The therapeutic communication methods of the nursing assessment take into account developmental stage (toddler vs. elderly), privacy, distractions, and age-related impediments to communication such as sensory deficits and language, place, time, non-verbal cues. Therapeutic communication is also facilitated by avoiding the use of the following:

- medical jargon: adjust vocabulary to where the client can clearly understand what is being said, use common language
- providing false reassurance
- giving unwanted advice to the client
- being authoritative: each person's role in the interview is of equal importance
- using avoidance language like euphemisms instead of being blunt and direct
- distancing: don't refer to things like a client's anatomy as “the”, instead use “your”
- talking too much: let the client do the talking, it allows for optimum sharing of information
- interrupting the client
- using biased questions: don't imply that one answer is better than the other
- using “why” questions: this makes the client have to justify instead of just sharing the information

During the first part of the personal interview, the nurse carries out an analysis of the patient needs. In many cases, the client requires a focused assessment rather than a comprehensive nursing assessment of the entire bodily systems, although a complete assessment may be necessary. In the focused assessment, the major complaint is assessed. The nurse may employ the use of acronyms performing the assessment:

- OLDCART
  - Onset of health concern or complaint
  - Location of pain or other symptoms related to the area of the body involved
  - Duration of health concern or complaint
  - Characteristics
  - Aggravating factors or what makes the concern or complaint worse
  - Relieving factors or what makes the concern or complaint better
  - Treatments or what treatments were tried in the past or ongoing

== Complete health history ==
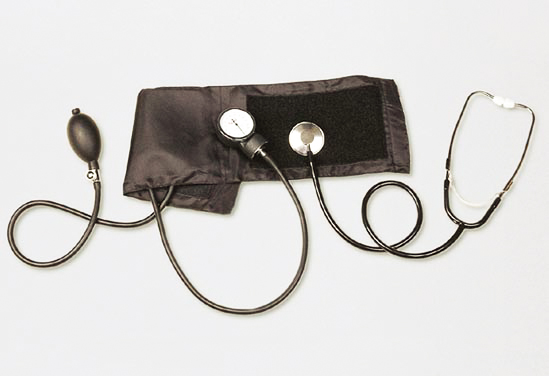
Auscultatory method aneroid sphygmomanometer with stethoscope

The complete health history is considered to be subjective but still of high importance when combined with objective measurements. High quality interviewing strategies include the use of open-ended questions. Open-ended questions are those that cannot be answered with a simple "yes" or "no" response. If the person is unable to respond, then family or caregivers will be given the opportunity to answer the questions.

The typical nursing assessment in the clinical setting will be the collection of data about the following topics included in a health history

- present complaint and nature of symptoms
- onset of symptoms
- severity of symptoms
- classifying symptoms as acute or chronic
- health history
- family history
- social history
- current medical and/or nursing management
- understanding of medical and nursing plans
- perception of illness

In addition, the nursing assessment may include reviewing the results of laboratory values such as blood work and urine analysis. Medical records of the client assist to determine the baseline measures related to their health.

In some instances, the nursing assessment will not incorporate the typical patient history and interview if prioritization indicates that immediate action is urgent to preserve the airway, breathing and circulation. This is also known as triage and is used in emergency rooms and medical team disaster response situations. The patient history is documented through a personal interview with the client and/or the client's family. If there is an urgent need for a focused assessment, the most obvious or troubling complaint will be addressed first. This is especially important in the case of extreme pain.

== Physical examination ==
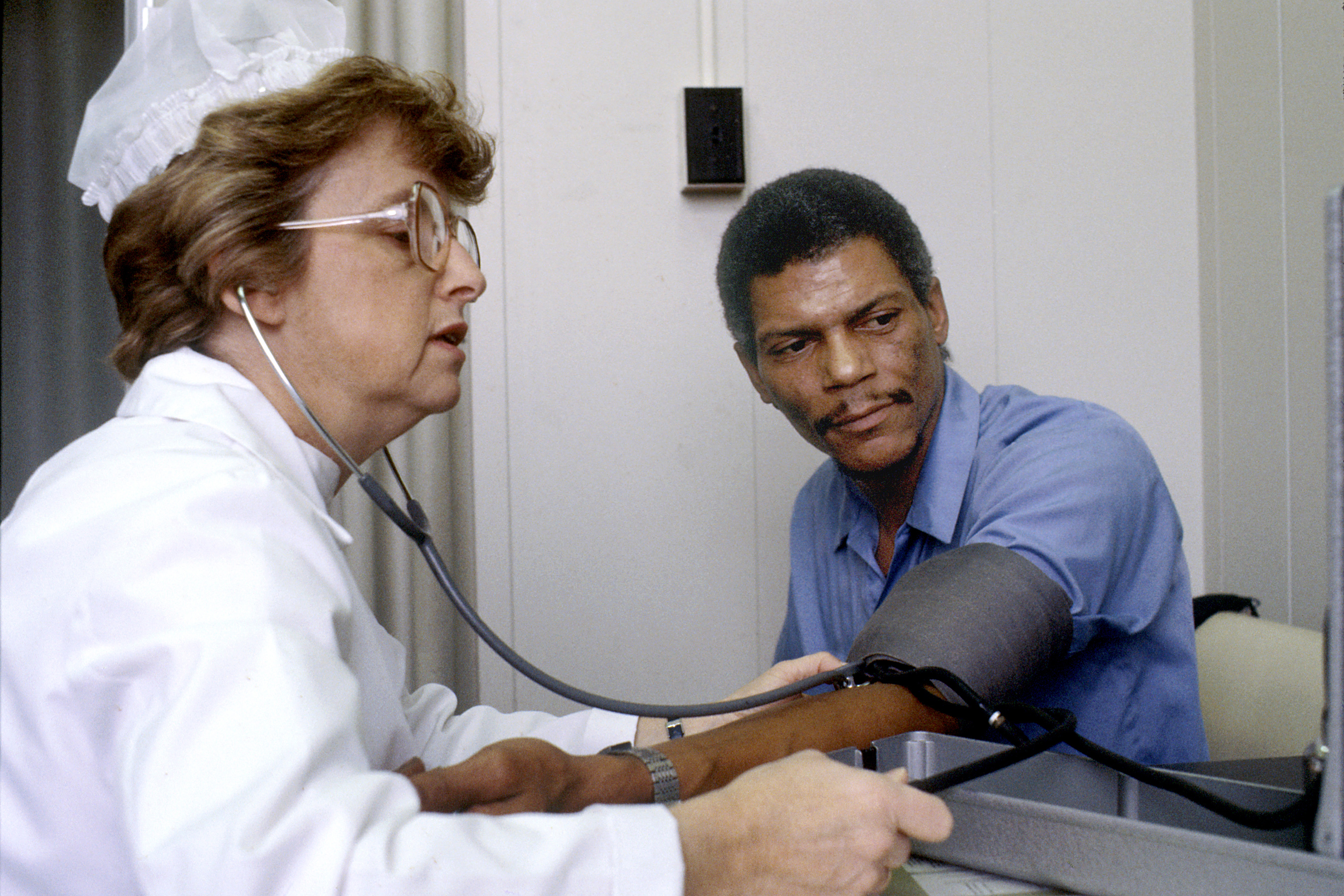
Assessing blood pressure

A nursing assessment includes a physical examination: the observation or measurement of signs, which can be observed or measured, or symptoms such as nausea or vertigo, which can be felt by the patient.

The techniques used may include inspection, palpation, auscultation and percussion in addition to the "vital signs" of temperature, blood pressure, pulse and respiratory rate, and further examination of the body systems such as the cardiovascular or musculoskeletal systems.

== Focused assessment ==
=== Neurovascular assessment ===
The nurse conducts a neurovascular assessment to determine sensory and muscular function of the arms and legs in addition to peripheral circulation. The focused neurovascular assessment includes the objective observation of pulses, capillary refill, skin color and temperature, and sensation. During the neurovascular assessment the measures between extremities are compared. A neurovascular assessment is an evaluation of the extremities along with sensory, circulation and motor function.

=== Mental status ===
During the assessment, interactions and functioning are evaluated and documented. Those specific items assessed include:

- orientation, memory,
- mood, depression, anxiety, coherence, hallucinations, illusions, insight
- speech patterns (rate, clarity clanging)
- grooming, personal hygiene, appropriateness of clothing
- response to verbal and tactile stimuli, level of consciousness, and alertness
- posture, gait, appropriateness of movements

=== Pain ===
Pain is no longer being identified as the fifth vital sign due to the prevalence of opioid abuse and overprescribing of narcotic pain relievers. However, assessment for pain is still very important. Assessment of a patient's experience of pain Pain (scale) is a crucial component in providing effective pain management. Pain is not a simple sensation that can be easily assessed and measured. Nurses should be aware of the many factors that can influence the patient's overall experience and expression of pain, and these should be considered during the assessment process. Systematic process of pain assessment, measurement, and re-assessment (re-evaluation), enhances the healthcare teams' ability to achieve. Pain is assessed for its provocative and palliative associations; quality, region/radiation, severity (numerical scale or pictorial, Wong-Baker Faces scale); and time—of onset, duration, frequency, and length of provocative and relief measures.

=== Integument ===
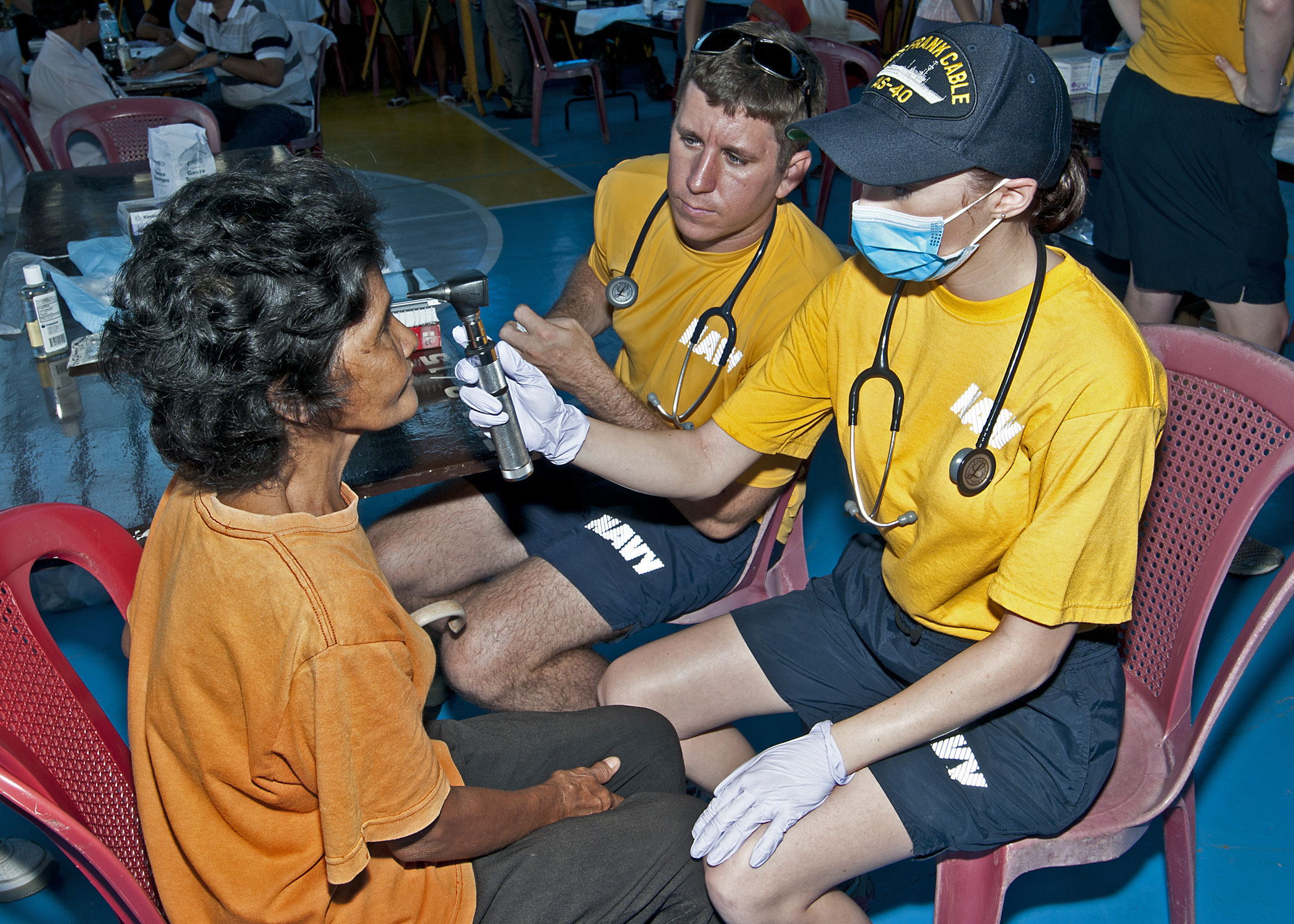
Performing an eye exam by military nurses

- hair: quantity, location, distribution, texture
- nails: shape and color, presence of clubbing
- lesions: type, location, arrangement, color of lesions, drainage, depth, width, length
- texture, moisture, color, elasticity, turgor

=== Head ===
- scalp, facial symmetry, sensation
- eyes
  - acuity
  - eyelids
  - lacrimal glands
  - conjunctiva
  - visual fields
  - peripheral vision
  - sclera
  - size, shape, symmetry, pupil reactions
  - movement (cranial nerves)
- ears
  - external structure
  - inner ear
  - eardrum
  - hearing (frequencies of sound detected)
- dentation
- mouth and throat
  - teeth
  - soreness
  - voice
  - swallowing
  - taste
  - bleeding
- nose
  - allergies
  - sinuses
  - mucus

=== Thorax ===
- heart
  - auscultation of heart sounds
  - apical impulse
  - location on chest
- lungs
  - auscultation of lung sounds
  - chest expansion

=== Abdomen ===
- auscultation of bowel sounds
- bowel habits
- palpation and percussion of internal organs

=== Musculoskeletal ===
- muscles
- joints
- bones
- range of motion

=== Genitourinary ===
- male
  - penis
  - scrotum
  - testicles
- female
  - vagina
  - obstetrics
  - menstruation
  - menopause
- urination
- sexual activity
- contraceptive use
- self-care

=== Psychosocial assessment ===
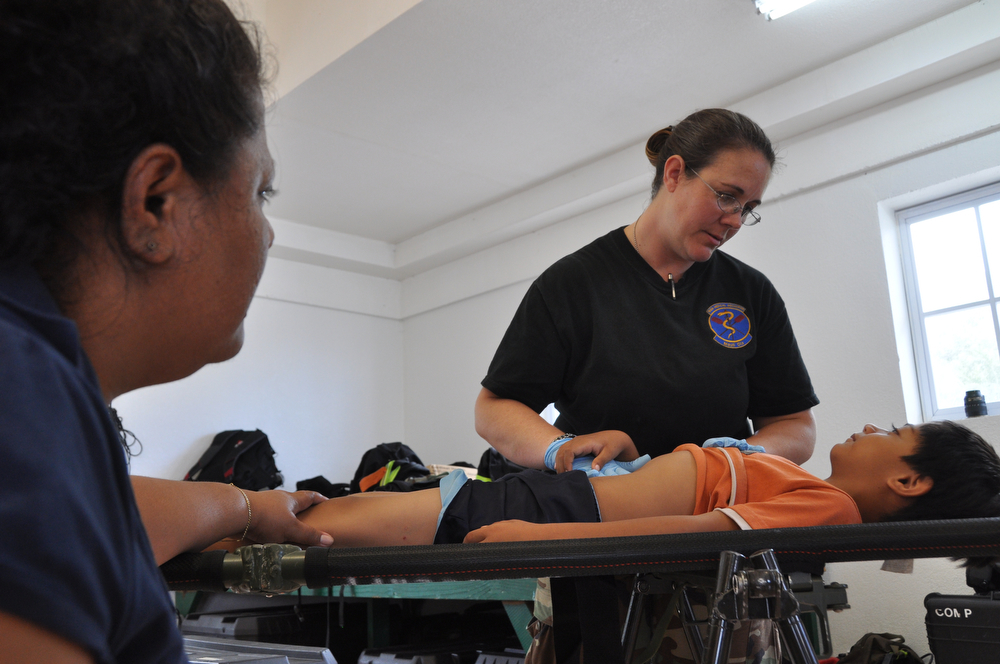
Abdominal palpation of a boy

The main areas considered in a psychological examination are intellectual health and emotional health. Assessment of cognitive function, checking for hallucinations and delusions, measuring concentration levels, and inquiring into the client's hobbies and interests constitute an intellectual health assessment. Emotional health is assessed by observing and inquiring about how the client feels and what he does in response to these feelings. The psychological examination may also include the client's perceptions (why they think they are being assessed or have been referred, what they hope to gain from the meeting). Religion and beliefs are also important areas to consider. The need for a physical health assessment is always included in any psychological examination to rule out structural damage or anomalies.

=== Safety ===
- environment
- social environment
- home environment
- ambulatory aids
- living assistance
- developmental considerations
- functional ability
- communication abilities
- occupational hazards

=== Cultural assessment ===
The nursing cultural assessment will identify factors that may impede or facilitate the implementation of a nursing diagnosis. Cultural factors have a major impact on the nursing assessment. Some of the information obtained during the interview include:

- ethnic origin
- primary language
- second language
- the need for an interpreter
- the client's main support system(s)
- family living arrangements
- Who is the major decision maker in the family? What are the family members' roles within the family
- Describe religious beliefs and practices
- Are there any religious requirements/restrictions that place limitations on the client's care?
- Who in the family takes responsibility for health concerns?
- Describe any special health beliefs and practices:
- From whom does family usually seek medical assistance in time of need?
- Describe client's usual emotional/behavioral response to: Anxiety: Anger: Loss/change/failure: Pain: Fear:
- Describe any topics that are particularly sensitive or that the client is unwilling to discuss (because of cultural taboos):
- Describe any activities in which the client is unwilling to participate (because of cultural customs or taboos):
- What are the client's personal feelings regarding touch?
- What are the client's personal feelings regarding eye contact?
- What is the client's personal orientation to time? (past, present, future)
- Describe any particular illnesses to which the client may be bioculturally susceptible (e.g., hypertension and sickle cell anemia in *African Americans):
- Describe any nutritional deficiencies to which the client may be bioculturally susceptible (e.g., lactose intolerance in Native and Asian Americans)
- Are there any foods the client requests or refuses because of cultural beliefs related to this illness (e.g., "hot" and "cold" foods for Latino Americans and Asian Americans)?

=== Care acuity ===
Care acuity (also known as patient acuity) is the measure the level of healthcare services needed by an patient, and is a foundational concept in clinical medicine, nursing practice, emergency care, and behavioral health.

== Assessment tools ==
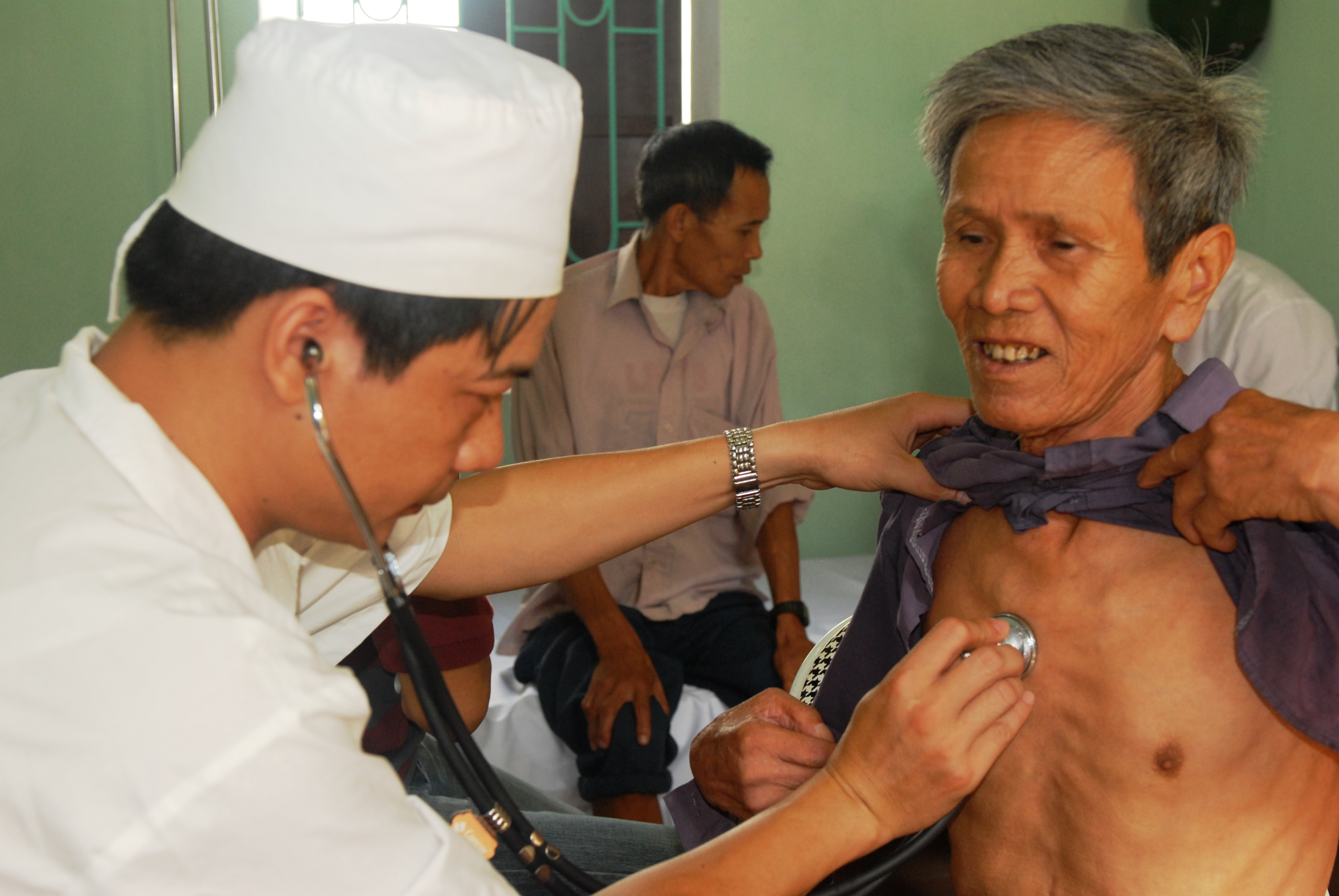
Auscultation assessing lung sounds

A range of instruments and tools have been developed to assist nurses in their assessment role. These include: the index of independence in activities of daily living, the Barthel index, the Crighton Royal behaviour rating scale, the Clifton assessment procedures for the elderly, the general health questionnaire, and the geriatric mental health state schedule.

Other assessment tools may focus on a specific aspect of the patient's care. For example, the Waterlow score and the Braden scale deals with a patient's risk of developing a Pressure ulcer (decubitus ulcer), the Glasgow Coma Scale measures the conscious state of a person, and various pain scales exist to assess the "fifth vital sign".

The use of medical equipment is routinely employed to conduct a nursing assessment. These include the otoscope, thermometer, stethoscope, penlight, sphygmomanometer, bladder scanner, speculum, and eye charts. Besides the interviewing process, the nursing assessment utilizes certain techniques to collect information such as observation, auscultation, palpation and percussion.

== See also ==
- Assessment (disambiguation)
- Nursing diagnosis

== Bibliography ==
- Ackley, Betty (2010). Nursing diagnosis handbook : an evidence-based guide to planning care. Maryland Heights, Mo: Mosby. ISBN 978-0-323-07150-5.
- Amico, Donita (2016). Health & physical assessment in nursing. Boston: Pearson. ISBN 978-0-13-387640-6.
- Bates, Barbara (1995). A pocket guide to physical examination and history taking. Philadelphia: Lippincott. ISBN 978-0-397-55057-9.
- Habich, Michele, and MariJo Letizia. 2015. "Pediatric Pain Assessment In the Emergency Department: A Nursing Evidence-Based Practice Protocol." Pediatric Nursing 41, no. 4: 198–202.
- Henry, Norma Jean, Mendy McMichael, Janean Johnson, Agnes DiStasi, Brenda S. Ball, Honey C. Holman, Mary Jane Janowski, Marsha S. Barlow, Peggy Leehy and Terri Lemon (2016). Fundamentals for Nursing, Review Module Edition 9.0. Assessment Technologies Institute. ISBN 978-1-56533-567-7.
- Jarvis, Carolyn, and Ann Eckhardt. Physical Examination and Health Assessment. Available from: VitalSource Bookshelf, (9th Edition). Elsevier - Evolve, [2023].
- Kozier, Barbara (2012). Kozier & Erb's fundamentals of nursing : concepts, process, and practice. Boston: Pearson. ISBN 978-0-13-802461-1.
- Longe, Jacqueline (2006). The Gale encyclopedia of nursing & allied health. Detroit: Thomson Gale. ISBN 1-4144-0377-1.
- Potter, Patricia (2013). Fundamentals of nursing. St. Louis, Mo: Mosby Elsevier. ISBN 978-0-323-07933-4.* Smith, Sandra (2008). Clinical nursing skills : basic to advanced skills. Upper Saddle River, N.J: Pearson Prentice Hall. ISBN 978-0-13-224355-1.
- Smith, Sandra (2002). Photo guide of nursing skills. Upper Saddle River, N.J: Prentice Hall. ISBN 978-0-8385-8174-2.
- Taylor, Carol (2015). Fundamentals of nursing : the art and science of person-centered nursing care. Philadelphia: Wolters Kluwer Health. ISBN 978-1-4511-8561-4
- Toney-Butler, Tammy, and Wendy Unison-Pace. "Nursing Admission Assessment and Examination." National Library of Medicine, StatPearls Publishing, 28 Aug. 2023, www.ncbi.nlm.nih.gov/books/NBK493211/.
- Townsend, Mary (2015). Psychiatric nursing : assessment, care plans, and medications. Philadelphia: F.A. Davis Company. ISBN 978-0-8036-4237-9.
- Weber, Janet (2014). Nurses' handbook of health assessment. Philadelphia: Wolters Kluwer/Lippincott Williams & Wilkins Health. ISBN 978-1-4511-4282-2.

== Journals ==
- Schreiber, Mary L. Evidence-Based Practice. Neurovascular Assessment: An Essential Nursing Focus. MEDSURG Nursing (MEDSURG NURS), Jan/Feb2016; 25(1): 55–57. ISSN 1092-0811
- Copeland, J; Kelleher, M.; Keller, J (1976). "A semistructured clinical interview for the assessment of diagnosis and mental state in the elderly: the geriatric mental state schedule – 1 development and reliability". Psychological Medicine. 6 (3): 439–449. doi:10.1017/S0033291700015889. PMID 996204. S2CID 36375156.
