= Nursing process =

Scientific method used in nursing practices worldwide

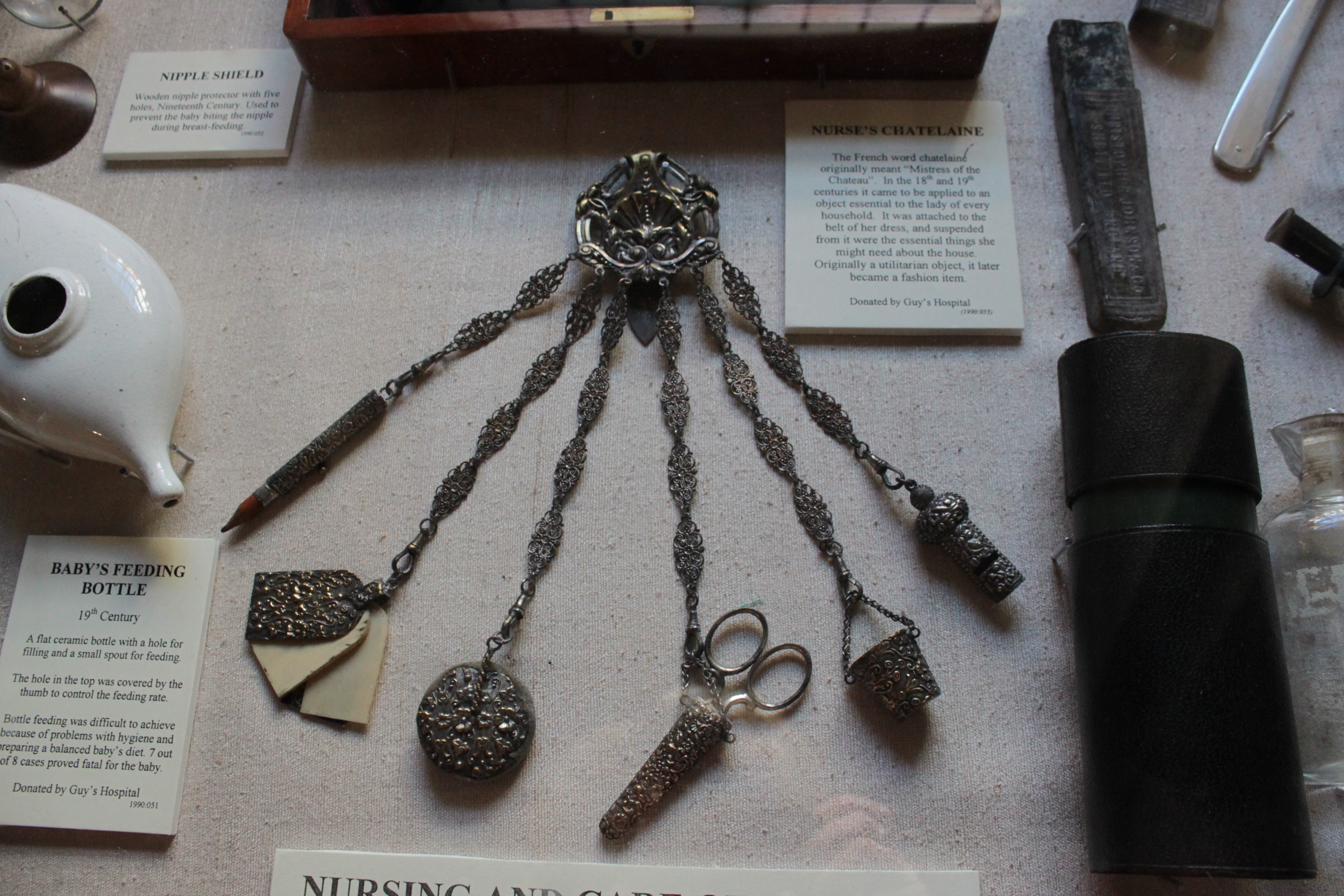
Nurse's chatelaine or tool kit; consisting of a pencil, a notebook, a pill box, scissors, a measure, and a whistle

The nursing process is a modified scientific method that is a fundamental part of nursing practices in many countries around the world. Nursing practice was first described as a four-stage nursing process by Ida Jean Orlando in 1958. It should not be confused with nursing theories or health informatics. The diagnosis phase was added later.

The nursing process uses clinical judgement to strike a balance of epistemology between personal interpretation and research evidence in which critical thinking may play a part to categorize the clients issue and course of action. Nursing offers diverse patterns of knowing. Nursing knowledge has embraced pluralism since the 1970s.

Evidence based practice (EBP)

Evidence-based practice is a problem-solving approach to clinical decision-making that uses the best available evidence. It supports the nursing process by helping nurses make informed choices about patient care.

Person-centered care

The nursing process incorporates patient participation in clinical decision-making. Person-centered care focuses on identifying and addressing each patient’s needs and preferences, supporting the development of individualized care plans.

== Phases ==
Diagram of the five-phase nursing process

The nursing process is a goal-oriented method of care that provides a framework for nursing care. It involves six major phases:

- A

Assess (what data is collected?) Patient vital signs (Temperature, Pulse, Blood pressure, Respirations, and Pulse oximeter), Medical history, Allergies, or Pain assessment.

- D

Diagnose (what is the problem?) Identify patient strengths and potential health problems and needs.

- O

Outcome Identification - (Was originally a part of the Planning phase, but has recently been added as a new step in the complete process).

- P

Plan (how to manage the problem) creating a care plan for that meets the needs of patient goals and related outcomes.

- I

Implement (putting plan into action)

- E

Evaluate (did the plan work?) Analyzing the outcomes of the plan of care in terms of patient goal achievement.

=== Assessing phase ===
The nurse completes a holistic nursing assessment of the needs of the individual/family/community, regardless of the reason for the encounter. The nurse collects subjective data and objective data using a nursing framework, such as Marjory Gordon's functional health patterns.

==== Models for data collection ====
Nursing assessments provide the starting point for determining nursing diagnoses. A recognized nursing assessment framework is used in practice to identify the patient's* problems, risks and outcomes for enhancing health. The use of an evidence-based nursing framework such as Gordon's Functional Health Pattern Assessment should guide assessments that support nurses in determination of NANDA-I nursing diagnoses. For determination of nursing diagnoses, an evidence-based assessment framework is best practice.

===== Methods =====
- Client Interview
- Physical Examination
- Obtaining a health history (including dietary data)
- Family history/report

=== Diagnosing phase ===
Nursing diagnoses represent the nurse's clinical judgment about actual or potential health problems/life process occurring with the individual, family, group or community. The accuracy of the nursing diagnosis is validated when a nurse is able to clearly identify and link to the defining characteristics, related factors and/or risk factors found within the patients assessment. Multiple nursing diagnoses may be made for one client.

=== Planning phase ===
In agreement with the client, the nurse addresses each of the problems identified in the diagnosing phase. When there are multiple nursing diagnoses to be addressed, the nurse prioritizes which diagnoses will receive the most attention first according to their severity and potential for causing more serious harm. The most common terminology for standardized nursing diagnosis is that of the evidence-based terminology developed and refined by NANDA International, the oldest and one of the most researched of all standardized nursing languages. For each problem a measurable goal/outcome is set. For each goal/outcome, the nurse selects nursing interventions that will help achieve the goal/outcome, which are aimed at the related factors (etiologies) not merely at symptoms (defining characteristics). A common method of formulating the expected outcomes is to use the evidence-based Nursing Outcomes Classification to allow for the use of standardized language which improves consistency of terminology, definition and outcome measures. The interventions used in the Nursing Interventions Classification again allow for the use of standardized language which improves consistency of terminology, definition and ability to identify nursing activities, which can also be linked to nursing workload and staffing indices. The result of this phase is a nursing care plan.

=== Implementing phase ===
The nurse implements the nursing care plan, performing the determined interventions that were selected to help meet the goals/outcomes that were established. Delegated tasks and the monitoring of them is included here as well.

Activities

- pre-assessment of the client-done before just carrying out implementation to determine if it is relevant
- determine need for assistance
- implementation of nursing orders
- delegating and supervising-determines who to carry out what action

=== Evaluating phase ===
The nurse evaluates the progress toward the goals/outcomes identified in the previous phases. If progress towards the goal is slow, or if regression has occurred, the nurse must change the plan of care accordingly. Conversely, if the goal has been achieved then the care can cease. New problems may be identified at this stage, and thus the process will start all over again.

== Characteristics ==
The nursing process is a cyclical and ongoing process that can end at any stage if the problem is solved. The nursing process exists for every problem that the individual/family/community has. The nursing process not only focuses on ways to improve physical needs, but also on social and emotional needs as well.

- Cyclic and dynamic
- Goal directed and client centered
- Interpersonal and collaborative
- Universally applicable
- Systematic

The entire process is recorded or documented in order to inform all members of the health care team.

== Nursing process and mental health ==
Nurses apply the nursing process to patients with depressive disorders by systematically assessing, diagnosing, planning, implementing, and evaluating care. During assessment, nurses gather data on mood, behavior, symptoms, suicidal indicators, and risk factors.

Based on this information, they develop nursing diagnoses commonly related to depression, such as risk for suicide, hopelessness, ineffective coping, self-care deficits, and disturbed sleep patterns.

Planning involves creating interventions aimed at promoting safety, encouraging participation in activities, and enhancing therapeutic communication. Nurses then implement these interventions to address the patient's needs.

Evaluation involves determining whether goals have been met, such as improved mood, increased participation in activities, and reduced depressive symptoms. If expected outcomes are not achieved, nurses adjust the care plan accordingly to better meet the patient’s needs. Care plans focus on safety, activity engagement, and communication.
