= Nursing care plan =

A nursing care plan provides direction on the type of nursing care the individual/family/community may need. The main focus of a nursing care plan is to facilitate standardised, evidence-based and holistic care. Nursing care plans have been used for quite a number of years for human purposes and are now also getting used in the veterinary profession. A care plan includes the following components: assessment, diagnosis, expected outcomes, interventions, rationale and evaluation.

According to UK nurse Helen Ballantyne, care plans are a critical aspect of nursing and they are meant to allow standardised, evidence-based holistic care. It is important to draw attention to the difference between care plan and care planning. Care planning is related to identifying problems and coming up with solutions to reduce or remove the problems. The care plan is essentially the documentation of this process. It includes within it a set of actions the nurse will apply to resolve/support nursing diagnoses identified by nursing assessment. Care plans make it possible for interventions to be recorded and their effectiveness assessed. Nursing care plans provide continuity of care, safety, quality care and compliance. A nursing care plan promotes documentation and is used for reimbursement purposes such as Medicare and Medicaid.

The therapeutic nursing plan is a tool and a legal document that contains priority problems or needs specific to the patient and the nursing directives linked to the problems. It shows the evolution of the clinical profile of a patient. The TNP is the nurse's responsibility. They are the only ones who can inscribe information and re-evaluate the TNP during the course of treatment of the patient. This document is used by nurses, nursing assistant and they communicate the directives to the beneficiary attendants. The priority problems or needs are often the diagnoses of the patient and nursing problem such as wounds, dehydration, altered state of consciousness, risk of complication and much more. These diagnoses are around problems or needs that are detected by nurses and need specific interventions and evaluation follow-up. The nursing directives can be addressed to nurses, nursing assistants or beneficiary attendants. Each priority problem or need must be followed by a nursing directive or an intervention. The interventions must be specific to the patient. For example, two patients with the problem 'uncooperative care' can need different directives. For one patient the directive could be: 'educate about the pathology and the effects of the drugs on the health situation'; for the other, it could be the'use a directive approach.' It depends on the nature of the problem which needs to be evaluated by a nurse.

== Objective ==
1. To promote evidence-based nursing care and to provide comfortable and familiar conditions in hospitals or health centers.
2. To promote holistic care which means the whole person is considered including physical, psychological, social and spiritual in relation to management and prevention of the disease.
3. To support methods such as care pathways and care bundles. Care pathways involve a team effort in order to come to a consensus with regard to standards of care and expected outcomes while care bundles are related to best practice with regard to care given for a specific disease.
4. To record care.
5. To measure care.
6. To provide treatment measure health issues or disease conditions
7. To Ensure the Psychological support and reduce stress anxiety to the patient

== History ==
The function of nursing care plans has changed drastically over the past several decades. In 1953, care planning was not believed to be within the nursing scope of practice. In the 1970s, care planning was activity based. Patients were listed according to the procedures they were having done, which determined their plan of care. Care provided was passed on by word of mouth, dressing books, and work lists. These forms of communication all focus on activities the nurse performed instead of focusing on the patient. Today, nursing care plans focus on the individual's unique set of needs and goals. Care plans are individualized to create a patient-centered approach to care. Therefore, nurses must perform a physical assessment prior to planning a patient's care.

== Components of a care plan ==
A care plan includes the following components;

1. Client assessment, medical results and diagnostic reports. This is the first step in order to be able to create a care plan. In particular client assessment is related to the following areas and abilities: physical, emotional, sexual, psychosocial, cultural, spiritual/transpersonal, cognitive, functional, age related, economic and environmental. Information is this area can be subjective and objective.
2. Expected patient outcomes are outlined. These may be long and short term.
3. Nursing interventions are documented in the care plan.
4. Rationale for interventions in order to be evidence based care.
5. Evaluation. This documents the outcome of nursing interventions.

== Computerised nursing care plans ==
A computerised nursing care plan is a digital way of writing the care plan, compared to handwritten. Computerised nursing care plans are an essential element of the nursing process. Computerised nursing care plans have increased documentation of signs and symptoms, associated factors and nursing interventions. Using electronic devices when creating nursing care plans are a more accurate, accessible, easier completed and easier edited, in comparison with handwritten and preprinted care plans.

== See also ==
- Nurse scheduling problem
- Omaha System
- NANDA International
