= Nursing diagnosis =

Clinical judgment made by a nurse

A nursing diagnosis may be part of the nursing process and is a clinical judgment about individual, family, or community experiences/responses to actual or potential health problems/life processes. Nursing diagnoses foster the nurse's independent practice (e.g., patient comfort or relief) compared to dependent interventions driven by physician's orders (e.g., medication administration). Nursing diagnoses are developed based on data obtained during the nursing assessment. A problem-based nursing diagnosis presents a problem response present at time of assessment. Risk diagnoses represent vulnerabilities to potential problems, and health promotion diagnoses identify areas which can be enhanced to improve health. Whereas a medical diagnosis identifies a disorder, a nursing diagnosis identifies the unique ways in which individuals respond to health or life processes or crises. The nursing diagnostic process is unique among others. A nursing diagnosis integrates patient involvement, when possible, throughout the process. NANDA International (NANDA-I) is a body of professionals that develops, researches and refines an official taxonomy of nursing diagnosis.

All nurses must be familiar with the steps of the nursing process in order to gain the most efficiency from their positions. In order to correctly diagnose, the nurse must make quick and accurate inferences from patient data during assessment, based on knowledge of the nursing discipline and concepts of concern to nurses.

== NANDA International ==
NANDA International, Inc., formerly known as the North American Nursing Diagnosis Association, is the primary organization for defining, researching, revising, distributing and integrating standardized nursing diagnoses worldwide. NANDA-I has worked in this area for more than 45 years to ensure that diagnoses are developed through a peer-reviewed process requiring standardised levels of evidence, definitions, defining characteristics, related factors or risk factors that enable nurses to identify potential diagnoses in the course of a nursing assessment. NANDA-I believes that it is critical that nurses are required to utilise standardised languages that provide not just terms (diagnoses) but the embedded knowledge from clinical practice and research that provides diagnostic criteria (definitions, defining characteristics) and the related or etiologic factors upon which nurses intervene. NANDA-I terms are developed and refined for actual (current) health responses and for risk situations, as well as providing diagnoses to support health promotion. Diagnoses are applicable to individuals, families, groups and communities. The taxonomy is published in multiple countries and has been translated into 18 languages; it is in use worldwide. As research in the field of nursing continues to grow, NANDA-I continually develops and adds new diagnostic labels.

Nursing diagnoses are a critical part of ensuring that the knowledge and contribution of nursing practice to patient outcomes are found within the electronic health record and can be linked to nurse-sensitive patient outcomes.

== Global ==
The ICNP (International Classification for Nursing Practice) published by the International Council of Nurses has been accepted by the World Health Organization family of classifications. ICNP is a nursing language which can be used by nurses to diagnose.

== Evolution of Nursing Diagnosis ==
Nursing diagnoses have become more structured as nursing education has improved. Diagnoses became more organized as critical thinking and problem-solving skills became more important in nursing. Standardized nursing diagnoses allow nurses to communicate clearly and provide better care.

== Development and Standardization of Nursing Diagnoses ==
Experts constantly update nursing diagnoses to make them better. One way they do this is through the Delphi method, where groups of nursing experts discuss and refine diagnoses over several rounds until they reach an agreement.

The Delphi method helps ensure that nursing diagnoses are clear, useful, and based on research. This method allows experts to improve nursing diagnoses so that nurses can apply them correctly in different healthcare settings. This process keeps nursing diagnoses up to date and relevant for patient care. It also helps promote consistency in how nurses assess and describe patient needs, which is important for communication and care planning.

== Structure ==
The NANDA-I system of nursing diagnosis provides for four categories and each has 3 parts: diagnostic label or the human response, related factors or the cause of the response, and defining characteristics found in the selected patient are the signs/symptoms present that are supporting the diagnosis.

1. Problem-focused diagnosis
  A clinical judgment about human experience/responses to health conditions/life processes that exist in an individual, family, or community. An example of an actual nursing diagnosis is: Sleep deprivation.
2. Risk diagnosis
  Describes human responses to health conditions/life processes that may develop in a vulnerable individual/family/community. It is supported by risk factors that contribute to increased vulnerability. An example of a risk diagnosis is: Risk for shock.
3. Health promotion diagnosis
  A clinical judgment about a person's, family's or community's motivation and desire to increase wellbeing and actualise human health potential as expressed in the readiness to enhance specific health behaviours, and can be used in any health state. An example of a health promotion diagnosis is: Readiness for enhanced nutrition.
4. Syndrome diagnosis
  A clinical judgment describing a specific cluster of nursing diagnoses that occur together, and are best addressed together and through similar interventions. An example of a syndrome diagnosis is: Relocation stress syndrome.

== Process ==
The diagnostic process requires a nurse to use critical thinking. In addition to knowing the nursing diagnoses and their definitions, the nurse becomes aware of defining characteristics and behaviors of the diagnoses, related factors to the diagnoses, and the interventions suited for treating the diagnoses.

1. Assessment
  The first step of the nursing process is assessment. During this phase, the nurse gathers information about a patient's psychological, physiological, sociological, and spiritual status. This data can be collected in a variety of ways. Generally, nurses will conduct a patient interview. Physical examinations, referencing a patient's health history, obtaining a patient's family history, and general observation can also be used to gather assessment data. Patient interaction is generally the heaviest during this evaluative stage.
2. Diagnosis
  The diagnosing phase involves a nurse making an educated judgement about a potential or actual health problem with a patient. Multiple diagnoses are sometimes made for a single patient. These assessments not only include a description of the problem or illness (e.g. sleep deprivation) but also whether or not a patient is at risk of developing further problems. These diagnoses are also used to determine a patient's readiness for health improvement and whether or not they may have developed a syndrome. The diagnoses phase is a critical step as it is used to determine the course of treatment.
3. Planning
  Once a patient and nurse agree of the diagnoses, a plan of action can be developed. If multiple diagnoses need to be addressed, the head nurse will prioritise each assessment and devote attention to severe symptoms and high risk patients. Each problem is assigned a clear, measurable goal for the expected beneficial outcome. For this phase, nurses generally refer to the evidence-based Nursing Outcome Classification, which is a set of standardised terms and measurements for tracking patient wellness. The Nursing Interventions Classification may also be used as a resource for planning.
4. Implementation
  The implementing phase is where the nurse follows through on the decided plan of action. This plan is specific to each patient and focuses on achievable outcomes. Actions involved in a nursing care plan include monitoring the patient for signs of change or improvement, directly caring for the patient or performing necessary medical tasks, educating and instructing the patient about further health management, and referring or contacting the patient for a follow-up. Implementation can take place over the course of hours, days, weeks, or even months.
5. Evaluation
  Once all nursing intervention actions have taken place, the nurse completes an evaluation to determine if the goals for patient wellness have been met. The possible patient outcomes are generally described under three terms: patient's condition improved, patient's condition stabilised, and patient's condition deteriorated. In the event where the condition of the patient has shown no improvement, or if the wellness goals were not met, the nursing process begins again from the first step.

== The Role of Nursing Assessment in Diagnosis ==
A nursing assessment is the first step in making a nursing diagnosis. The way a nurse collects and organizes patient information affects how accurate the diagnosis will be.

Studies show that some nursing assessment tools have weaknesses, which can lead to less accurate diagnoses. Better assessment methods improve patient care by giving nurses a clearer picture of a patient’s health. When nurses have the right tools, they can make better diagnoses and choose the best care for their patients.

== Communication and Cultural Considerations in Nursing Diagnosis ==
Good communication is important when making nursing diagnoses. Nurses care for patients from different backgrounds, and cultural differences can affect how patients describe their symptoms.

Nurses need intercultural communication skills to understand their patients better. When nurses respect and consider cultural differences, they can make more accurate diagnoses and provide care that fits each patient’s needs.

Cultural competence means understanding different health beliefs, values, and ways of communicating. For example, some patients may describe pain differently or may have different views on illness and recovery. If there is a misunderstanding, a patient might not get the right diagnosis or treatment. Nurses should be aware of these differences to provide the best care.

== Challenges in Learning Nursing Diagnosis ==
Learning how to use nursing diagnoses can be difficult for nursing students. Many students struggle with clinical reasoning, which is the ability to think through patient problems and choose the right diagnosis.

Stress and mental health challenges can also affect how well students learn. It may be hard to tell the difference between similar diagnoses or apply them in real-life situations. To help students learn better, nursing schools use case studies, simulations, and hands-on training. These tools help students practice and feel more confident when working with patients.

== Impact of Nursing Diagnosis on Patient Care ==
Nursing diagnoses help improve patient care by:

- Identifying patients’ needs more clearly
- Helping nurses and other healthcare workers communicate better
- Improving patient safety by finding risks early
- Supporting evidence-based nursing, so care is based on research

Studies show that accurate nursing diagnoses lead to better health outcomes. If nurses have good assessment tools, strong communication skills, and the right training, they can make better diagnoses and improve patient care.

== Examples ==
The following are nursing diagnoses arising from the nursing literature with varying degrees of authentication by ICNP or NANDA-I standards.

- Anxiety
- Constipation
- Pain
- Decreased Activity Tolerance
- Impaired Gas Exchange
- Excessive Fluid Volume
- Caregiver Role Strain
- Ineffective Coping
- Readiness for Enhanced Health Maintenance
- Readiness for enhanced spiritual well-being
- Liver cirrhosis

== See also ==
- Clinical Care Classification System
- Clinical formulation
- Nursing
- Nursing process
- Nursing care plan
- Nursing Interventions Classification (NIC)
- Nursing Outcomes Classification (NOC)
