= NANDA International =

American nursing organization

NANDA International (NANDA-I)
- NANDA International (NANDA-I)
- formerly the North American Nursing Diagnosis Association (no longer used)
- Founded: 1982
- Headquarters: Oconto Falls, WI, US
- Location: International
- Members: 533
- Key people: Dr. T. Heather Herdman (PhD, RN, FNI, FAAN), CEO
- Website: Nanda.org

NANDA International (formerly the North American Nursing Diagnosis Association) is a professional organization of nurses interested in standardized nursing terminology, that was officially founded in 1982 and develops, researches, disseminates and refines the nomenclature, criteria, and taxonomy of nursing diagnosis. In 2002, NANDA became NANDA International in response to the broadening scope of its membership. NANDA International published Nursing Diagnosis quarterly, which became the International Journal of Nursing Terminologies and Classifications, and then later was reconceptualized as the International Journal of Nursing Knowledge, which remains in print today. The Membership Network Groups foster collaboration among NANDA-I members in countries (Bolivia, Brazil, Ecuador, Iran, Italy, Mexico, Peru, Portugal, and Nigeria-Ghana) and for languages: the German Language Group (Germany, Austria, Switzerland) and the Dutch Language Group (Netherlands and Belgium).

== History ==
In 1973, Kristine Gebbie and Mary Ann Lavin called the First National Conference on the Classification of Nursing Diagnoses (Gebbie & Lavin, 1975). It was held in St. Louis, Missouri. Attendees produced a beginning classification, an alphabetized list of nursing diagnoses. The conference also created three structures: A National Clearinghouse for Nursing Diagnoses, located at Saint Louis University and led by Ann Becker; a Nursing Diagnosis Newsletter, edited by Anne Perry; and a National Conference Group to standardize nursing terminology and led by Marjory Gordon. In 1982 NANDA was formed, and included members from the United States and Canada.

NANDA developed a nursing classification to organize nursing diagnoses into different categories. Although the taxonomy was revised to accommodate new diagnoses, in 1994 it became apparent that an overhaul was needed. In 2002 Taxonomy II, which was a revised version of Gordon's functional health patterns (Gordon, 1994), was released.

In 2002, NANDA became NANDA International in response to requests from its growing base of membership from outside North America. The acronym of NANDA was retained in the name because of the name recognition, but it is no longer merely "North American", and has members from 35 countries as of 2018.

== Research and electronic health record utilization ==
Research has shown that NANDA-I is the most used, most researched of the standardized nursing languages (Tastan, S., Linch, G. C., Keenan, G. M., Stifter, J., McKinney, D., Fahey, L., ... & Wilkie, D. J., 2014). Their findings showed that the number of standardized nursing language (SNL) publications increased primarily since 2000, with most focusing on NANDA International, the Nursing Interventions Classification, and the Nursing Outcome Classification. The majority of the studies were descriptive, qualitative, or correlational designs that provide a strong base for understanding the validity and reliability of the concepts underlying the standardized nursing terminologies. There is evidence supporting the successful integration and use in electronic health records for two standardized nursing terminology sets: (1) the combination of NANDA International nursing diagnoses, Nursing Interventions Classification, and Nursing Outcome Classification; and (2) the Omaha System set.

== Presidents ==
- Dr. Marjory Gordon (Chair 1973-1982), 1982-1988
- Jane Lancour, 1988-1993
- Dr. Lois Hoskins, 1993-1996
- Dr. Judith Warren, 1996-1998
- Dr. Dorothy A. Jones, 1998-2000
- Dr. Kay Coalson Avant, 2000-2002
- Dr. Mary Ann Lavin, 2002-2004
- Dr. Martha Craft-Rosenberg, 2004-2006
- Dr. Mary Ann Lavin, 2006-2008
- Dr. T. Heather Herdman, 2008-2010
- Dr. Jane Brokel, 2010-2012
- Prof. Dickon Weir-Hughes, 2012-2016
- Dr. Shigemi Kamitsuru, 2016-2020
- Carme Espinosa, 2020 – 2023
- Dr. Laura Rossi, 2023 – 2025
- Dr. Hortensia Castañeda-Hidalgo, 2025 – current

== Taxonomy II ==
The current structure of NANDA's nursing diagnosis classification is referred to as Taxonomy II and has three levels: Domains (13), Classes (48) and Diagnoses (277) (Herdman, Kamitsuru, & Lopes, 2024). In addition, there is a multiaxial structure, consisting of 8 axes.

NANDA-I terms include a definition, diagnostic criteria (signs/symptoms or defining characteristics, and related or risk factors) which are used by the nurse to diagnose a patient's response to actual or potential health conditions or life processes, and which form the basis for the selection of nursing interventions to achieve outcomes for which the nurse has accountability.

NANDA-I terms are found within SNOMED CT, many terms are linked to MeSH terms, and the terminology is registered with Health Level Seven International (Hl7).

== See also ==
- Nursing diagnoses (category)
- Nursing diagnosis
- Nursing process
