= Betsy Humphreys =

American medical librarian

- Humphreys in 2017, at an NLM gala honoring her 44 years of service.
- Born: April 26, 1947 (age 79); Lowell, Massachusetts, USA
- Other name: Betsy L. Humphreys
- Education: Smith College; University of Maryland, College Park
- Occupation: Medical librarian
- Employer: National Library of Medicine
- Known for: SNOMED CT
- Spouse: Glenn Palatini

Betsy L. Humphreys (born April 26, 1947) is an American medical librarian and health informatician known for leading the cross-institutional efforts to establish biomedical terminology standards such as SNOMED CT and the Unified Medical Language System. She was the deputy director of the National Library of Medicine from 2005 until her retirement in 2017, serving as acting director from 2015 to 2016.

== Early life ==
Betsy Humphreys was born in Lowell, Massachusetts, the middle child of three. Her mother was a competitive athlete, and her father was a life insurance underwriter and amateur athlete.

== Education and career ==
Betsy Humphreys earned her B.A. from Smith College in 1969. She earned her M.L.S. from the University of Maryland, College Park in 1972.

Humphreys joined the National Library of Medicine (NLM) in 1973. She served on the MEDLARS III Task Force. Throughout her time at NLM, Humphreys worked to automate library processes and was instrumental in launching DOCLINE.

Humphreys accepts a plaque from Dr. Daniel Vreeman of the Regenstrief Institute in 2017, acknowledging her contributions to health data standards.

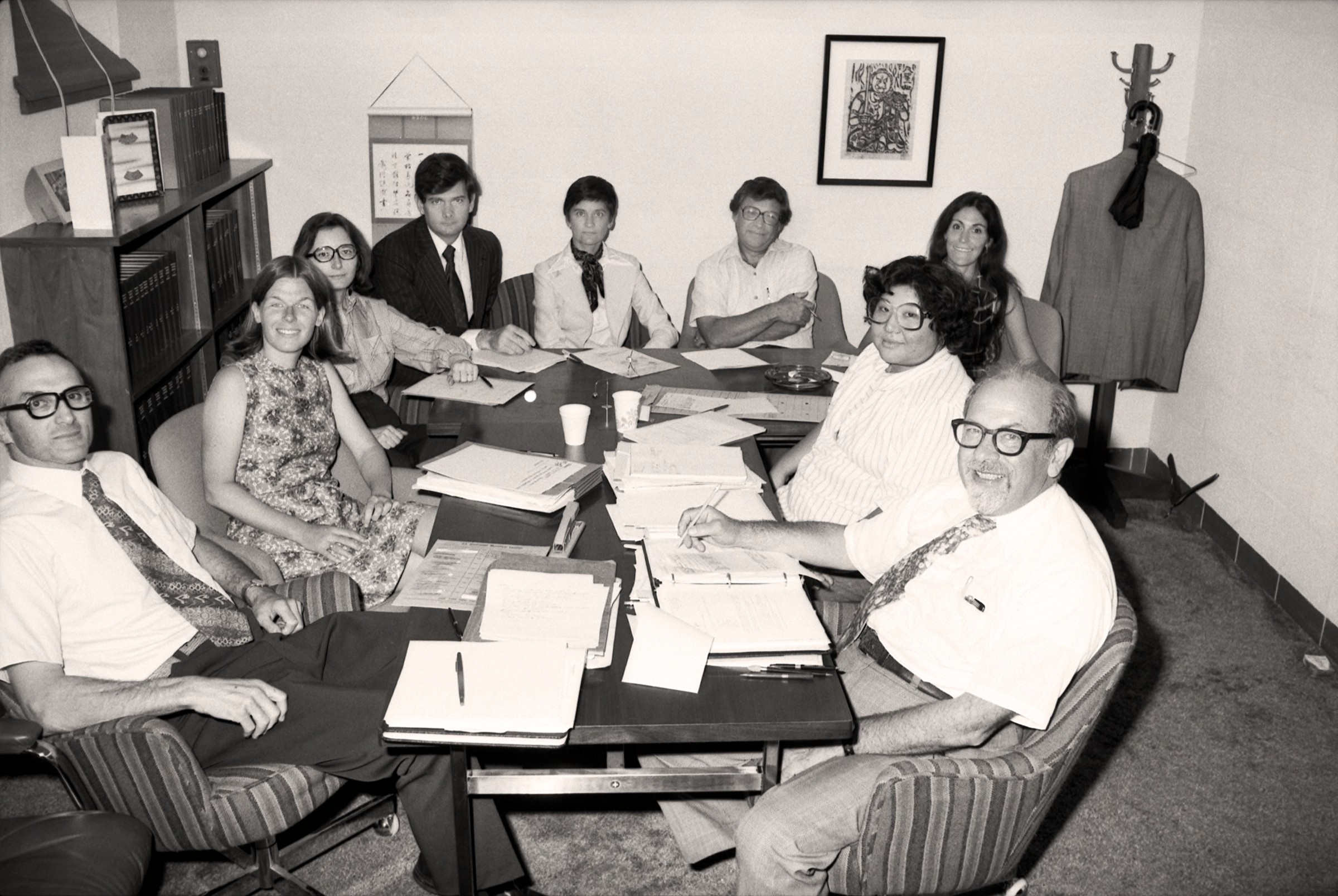
A meeting of the task force of the Medical Literature Analysis and Retrieval System at the National Library of Medicine. Humphreys is seated second from the left.

Humphreys negotiated the U.S. nationwide license for the clinical terminology SNOMED CT and served as founding chair for the International Health Terminology Standards Organisation.

From 2005 to June 30, 2017, Humphreys served as deputy director of the National Library of Medicine's. Additionally, from 2015 to 2016, she served as the acting director, becoming the first woman and the first librarian to direct the National Library of Medicine.

== Awards and honors ==
She was named a Fellow of the American College of Medical Informatics in 1990. In 2008, she was named a Fellow of the Medical Library Association. Humphreys was also elected a member of the National Academy of Medicine.

She has received several awards, including the Morris F. Collen Award for Excellence from the American College of Medical Informatics, the Marcia C. Noyes Award from the Medical Library Association, the Cornerstone Award from the Association of Academic Health Sciences Libraries, and the Smith College Medal.

In 2017, as part of a weeklong celebration of her career and service, a LOINC (Logical Observation Identifiers Names and Codes) code was reserved in her honor: LOINC 86466-0 – "Maestro of scalable information infrastructure".
