= Judith J. Warren =

American nursing informatics specialist

Judith J. Warren is an American nurse, educator, and researcher, known for being a pioneer in the field of nursing informatics. Her work has focused on integrating nursing science, information technology, and patient care. She holds the title of professor emerita at the University of Kansas School of Nursing.

== Early life and education ==
Judith J. Warren studied nursing at the University of Hawaii and Texas Woman's University. She earned her Ph.D. in educational psychology from the University of Hawaii in 1987.

== Career ==
Warren began her academic career at the University of Nebraska in Omaha, where she focused her research on the use of standardized coding and classification systems in nursing. In 1996, she was elected as a Fellow in the American Academy of Nursing.

She is a professor emerita of the University of Kansas School of Nursing. She held faculty positions at the University of Kansas, serving as an adjunct professor in the School of Medicine's Department of Biostatistics and as an associate professor in the Nursing Department. During her tenure, she held several key administrative roles, including the Christine A. Hartley Centennial Professor of Nursing, Director of Nursing Informatics in the KUMC Center for Health Informatics, and Director of the Graduate Program of Health Informatics. She also served as assistant director of the Frontiers Heartland Institute of Clinical and Translational Research's Center for Biomedical Informatics.

As a faculty member at the University of Kansas School of Nursing, Warren collaborated with Cerner Corporation to develop the Simulated E-health Delivery System (SEEDS), an adaptation of electronic health record software that has been adopted by over 60 schools of nursing, medicine, pharmacy, and allied health. SEEDS provides students with a platform for data analysis using virtual patient scenarios, simulations, and clinical experiences to enhance their informatics competencies.

In recognition of her achievements, the University of Kansas Graduate Health Informatics Program established the Judith J Warren Informatics Excellence Student Award in 2015.

=== Professional involvement and recognition ===
In 2003, Warren was elected as a Fellow in the American College of Medical Informatics.

She was a member of the advisory board for the National Center Data Repository (NCDR) for the National Center for Interprofessional Practice and Education (NCIPE).

In partnership with the National Database for Nursing Quality Indicators, she contributed to the development of eMeasures by aligning their nursing quality indicators with Meaningful Use criteria in 2015.

Warren has served on both the Quality Assurance and Content Committees of the International Health Terminology Standards Development Organization (IHTSDO), which is responsible for developing SNOMED CT. She remains actively involved with the Nursing Special Interest Group for SNOMED CT. Her involvement with SNOMED began in 1995 when she was appointed as the official American Nurses Association (ANA) liaison to the SNOMED Editorial Board. Her research on the SNOMED CT Nursing Problem List Subset, co-authored with Susan A. Matney, Jonathan L. Evans, Tae Youn Kim, Amy Coenen, and Vivian A. Auld, has significantly advanced nursing informatics.

She also played a key role as an organizing committee member for the Nursing Terminology Summit, which focused on collaborative progress in nursing terminology standards.

Warren led the Commission on Accreditation of Health Informatics and Information Management (CAHIIM) as Chair of its board of directors. She previously chaired the organization's Health Informatics Accreditation Council.

She previously served on the Department of Health and Human Services National Committee on Vital and Health Statistics, co-chairing its Standards Subcommittee. Notably, she was the first nurse to serve on the committee. Through her influence, she broadened the scope of the Medicare Modernization Act to include all prescribers, not just physicians, ensuring that nurses and other healthcare professionals with prescriptive authority are recognized. Warren's contributions emphasized the importance of considering the patient's perspective in discussions about standards and confidentiality.

=== Contributions to nursing informatics ===
Warren's contributions to the North American Nursing Diagnosis Association (NANDA) Taxonomy span almost two decades, promoting multidisciplinary approaches for conceptualizing nursing knowledge within digital platforms.

Warren has been a leading figure in developing a standardized reference terminology for nursing, including pioneering a model for nursing interventions.

Her publications explore advancing clinical informatics through academic-business partnerships, leveraging big data in nursing, enhancing interoperability of nursing terminologies, developing effective educational strategies for the field, and improving patient care through the integration of electronic health records and clinical decision support systems.

== Awards ==
- 2009: KU Chancellor's Distinguished Teaching Award for Excellence in Teaching
- 2011: KUMC Nursing Alumni Award
- 2012: Virginia K. Saba National Award for Nursing Informatics
- 2014: International Health Terminology Standards Development Organization's Excellence Award

She holds the distinction of being the first U.S. nurse and second U.S. informatician to receive the International Health Terminology Standards Development Organization (IHTSDO) Award for Excellence, which she was awarded in 2014.

== Selected publications ==
- Westra, Bonnie L.; Latimer, Gail E.; Matney, Susan A.; Park, Jung In; Sensmeier, Joyce; Simpson, Roy L.; Swanson, Mary Jo; Warren, Judith J.; Delaney, Connie W. (2015). "A national action plan for sharable and comparable nursing data to support practice and translational research for transforming health care". Journal of the American Medical Informatics Association. 22 (3): 600–607. doi:10.1093/jamia/ocu011. PMC 11737381. PMID 25670754.
- Matney, S.; Warren, J. J.; Casey, A. (2009). "Educating a health terminologist". Studies in Health Technology and Informatics. 146: 577–581. PMID 19592908.
- Warren, Judith J.; Matney, Susan A.; Foster, Erin D.; Auld, Vivian A.; Roy, Susan L. (2015). "Toward Interoperability". CIN: Computers, Informatics, Nursing. 33 (12): 515–519. doi:10.1097/CIN.0000000000000210. PMC 4690543. PMID 26678815.
- Kennedy, Diane; Pallikkathayil, Leonie; Warren, Judith J. (2009). "Using a Modified Electronic Health Record to Develop Nursing Process Skills". Journal of Nursing Education. 48 (2): 96–100. doi:10.3928/01484834-20090201-07. PMID 19260402.
