= Systematized Nomenclature of Medicine =

Collection of standard medical terms

The Systematized Nomenclature of Medicine (SNOMED) is a systematic, computer-processable collection of medical terms, in human and veterinary medicine, to provide codes, terms, synonyms and definitions which cover anatomy, diseases, findings, procedures, microorganisms, substances, etc. It allows a consistent way to index, store, retrieve, and aggregate medical data across specialties and sites of care. Although now international, SNOMED was started in the U.S. by the College of American Pathologists (CAP) in 1973 and revised into the 1990s. In 2002 CAP's SNOMED Reference Terminology (SNOMED RT) was merged with, and expanded by, the National Health Service's Clinical Terms Version 3 (previously known as the Read codes) to produce SNOMED CT.

Versions of SNOMED released prior to 2001 were based on a multiaxial, hierarchical classification system. As in any such system, a disease may be located in a body organ (anatomy), which results in a code in a topography axis and may lead to morphological alterations represented by a morphology code.

In 2002 the first release of SNOMED CT adopted a completely different structure. A sub-type hierarchy, supported by defining relationships based on description logic, replaced the axes described in this article. Versions of SNOMED prior to SNOMED CT are planned to be formally deprecated from 2017. Therefore, readers interested in current information about SNOMED are directed to the article on SNOMED CT.

== Purpose ==
SNOMED was designed as a comprehensive nomenclature of clinical medicine for the purpose of accurately storing and/or retrieving records of clinical care in human and veterinary medicine. The metaphor used by Roger A. Côté, the first editorial chair, was that SNOMED would become the periodic table of elements of medicine because of its definitional organization beyond the hierarchical design. Indeed, diseases and procedures were ordered hierarchically and are further referenced back to more elementary terms

== History ==
SNOMED was originally conceived by Côté as an extension of the design of the Systematized Nomenclature of Pathology (SNOP) applicable for all medicine. SNOP was originally designed by Arnold Pratt to describe pathological specimens according to their morphology and anatomy (topography). The ambitious development of SNOMED required many more axes (see multi-axial design, below). SNOMED was jointly proposed for development to the College of American Pathologists by Côté and Pratt. The former was appointed as editorial chair of the Committee on Nomenclature and Classification of Diseases of the CAP and developed the SNOMED from 1973 to 1997. In 1998, Kent Spackman was appointed to chair this committee and spearheaded the transformation of the multi-axis systems into a highly computable form (See SNOMED CT): a directed acyclic graph anchored in formal representation logic. In 2007, the newly formed International Health Terminology Standards Development Organisation (IHTSDO) acquired all the Intellectual Property of SNOMED CT and all antecedent SNOMED versions.

Brief timeline:

- 1965 SNOP
- 1974 SNOMED
- 1979 SNOMED II
- 1993 SNOMED International 3.0
- 1995 SNOMED Microglossary of Signs and Symptoms
- 1993-98 SNOMED International versions 3.1-3.5
- 2002 First release of SNOMED CT
- 2007 All versions of SNOMED acquired by IHTSDO
- 2017 All SNOMED versions except SNOMED CT have been formally deprecated by IHTSDO

== Reference ontology ==
SNOMED was designed from its inception with complex concepts defined in terms of simpler ones. For example, a disease can be defined in terms of its abnormal anatomy, abnormal functions and morphology. In some cases, the etiology of the disease is known and can be attributed to an infectious agent, a physical trauma or a chemical or pharmaceutical agent.

== Multi-axial design ==
The current concept uses eleven (11) axes that comprise terms organised in hierarchical trees. The axes and some examples are provided below:

=== T (Topography) – Anatomic terms ===
- (T-28000) Lung
- (T-32000) Heart
- (T-51000) Mouth
- (T-D2500) Hip
- (T-D9600) Heel

=== M (Morphology) – Changes found in cells, tissues and organs ===
- (M-40000) Inflammation
- (M-44000) Granuloma
- (M-54700) Infarcted
- (M-54701) Microscopic infarct

For the Morphology axis, SNOMED has agreed to collaborate and use the same harmonized codes shared with International Classification of Diseases for Oncology. Additional examples on topology are provided on that page.

=== L (Living organisms) – Bacteria and viruses ===
- (L-21801) Mycobacterium tuberculosis
- (L-25116) Streptococcus pneumoniae

=== C (Chemical) – Drugs ===
- (C-C137A) Bufferin Analgesic Tablets
- (C-C137B) Bufferin Analgesic Caplets

=== F (Function) – Signs and symptoms ===
- (F-03003) Fever

=== J (Occupation) – Terms that describe the occupation ===
- Kindergarten teacher (13420)
- Computer programmer (08420)
- Doctor (06105)
- Professional Nurse (General) (07110)
- Beautician (57040)

=== D (Diagnosis) – Diagnostic terms ===
- (D-13510) Pneumococcal pneumonia
- (D-14800) Tuberculosis
- (D3-15000) Myocardial infarction

=== S (Social context) – Social conditions and important relationships in medicine ===
- (S-10120) Mother

== See also ==
- Diagnosis code
- Drug class
- DOCLE
- Medical classification
- SNOMED CT
- Medical Dictionary for Regulatory Activities (MedDRA)
- Pathology Messaging Implementation Project
