= RxNorm =

Medical dictionary

RxNorm is US-specific terminology in medicine that contains all medications available on the US market. It can also be used in personal health records applications. RxNorm is part of Unified Medical Language System (UMLS) terminology and is maintained by the United States National Library of Medicine (NLM).

== Use ==
As of May 2017, NLM provides six APIs related to RxNorm. There is also a web application called RxMix that allows users to access the RxNorm APIs without writing their own programs.

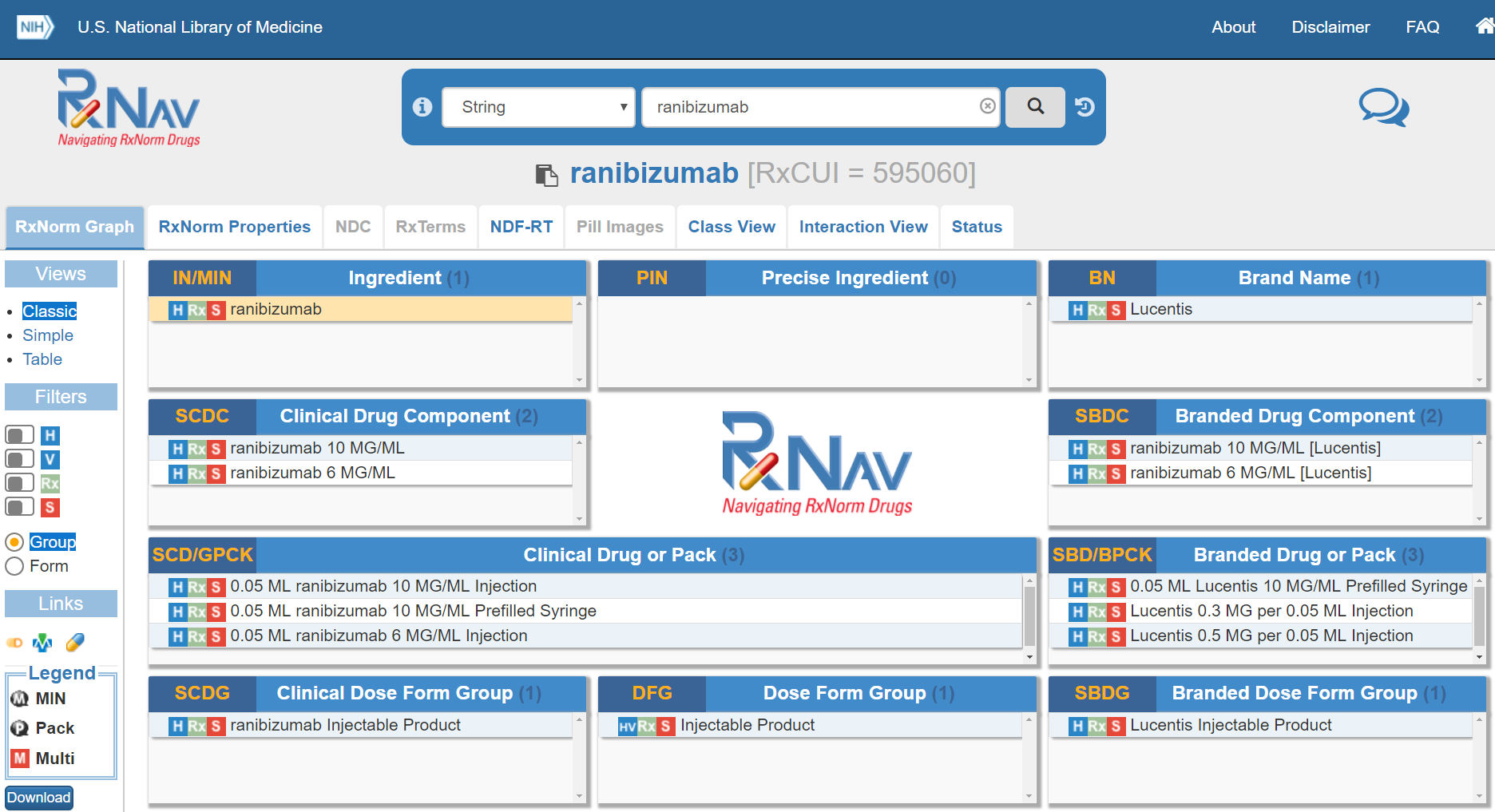
RxNorm web viewer (RxNav)

== See also ==
- Anatomical Therapeutic Chemical Classification System
