= DailyMed =

Website providing FDA medication label information

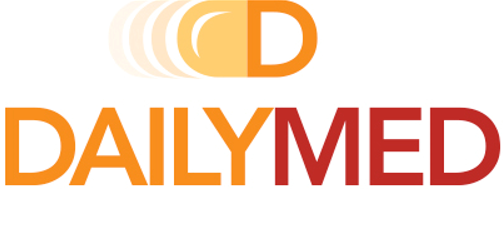
- Available in: English
- Creator: National Library of Medicine
- Website: dailymed.nlm.nih.gov

DailyMed is a website operated by the U.S. National Library of Medicine (NLM) to publish up-to-date and accurate drug labels (also called a "package insert") to health care providers and the general public.

The contents of DailyMed is provided and updated daily by the U.S. Food and Drug Administration (FDA). The FDA in turn collects this information from the pharmaceutical industry.

== Format ==
The documents published use the HL7 version 3 Structured Product Labeling (SPL) standard, which is an XML format that combines the human readable text of the product label with structured data elements that describe the composition, form, packaging, and other properties of the drug products in detail according to the HL7 Reference Information Model (RIM).

As of August 21, 2021, it contained information about 140,232 drug listings.

It includes an RSS feed for updated drug information.

== History ==
In 2006 the FDA revised the drug label and also created DailyMed to keep prescription information up to date.

== See also ==
- Consumer Product Information Database, ingredients of household products
- Environmental Working Group, which maintains a database of cosmetics ingredients
