= Unified Medical Language System =

Online compendium of Bioinformatics & related software tools

The Unified Medical Language System (UMLS) is a compendium of many controlled vocabularies in the biomedical sciences (created 1986). It provides a mapping structure among these vocabularies and thus allows one to translate among the various terminology systems; it may also be viewed as a comprehensive thesaurus and ontology of biomedical concepts. UMLS further provides facilities for natural language processing. It is intended to be used mainly by developers of systems in medical informatics.

UMLS consists of Knowledge Sources (databases) and a set of software tools.

The UMLS was designed and is maintained by the US National Library of Medicine, is updated quarterly and may be used for free. The project was initiated in 1986 by Donald A.B. Lindberg, M.D., then Director of the Library of Medicine, and directed by Betsy Humphreys.

== Purpose and applications ==
The number of biomedical resources available to researchers is enormous. Often this is a problem due to the large volume of documents retrieved when the medical literature is searched. The purpose of the UMLS is to enhance access to this literature by facilitating the development of computer systems that understand biomedical language. This is achieved by overcoming two significant barriers: "the variety of ways the same concepts are expressed in different machine-readable sources & by different people" and "the distribution of useful information among many disparate databases & systems".

== Licensing ==
Users of the system are required to sign a "UMLS agreement" and file brief annual usage reports. Academic users may use the UMLS free of charge for research purposes. Commercial or production use requires copyright licenses for some of the incorporated source vocabularies.

== Knowledge Sources ==
=== Metathesaurus ===
The Metathesaurus forms the base of the UMLS and comprises over 1 million biomedical concepts and 5 million concept names, all of which stem from the over 100 incorporated controlled vocabularies and classification systems. Some examples of the incorporated controlled vocabularies are CPT, ICD-10, MeSH, SNOMED CT, DSM-IV, LOINC, WHO Adverse Drug Reaction Terminology, UK Clinical Terms, RxNorm, Gene Ontology, and OMIM (see full list).

The Metathesaurus is organized by concept, and each concept has specific attributes defining its meaning and is linked to the corresponding concept names in the various source vocabularies. Numerous relationships between the concepts are represented, for instance hierarchical ones such as "isa" for subclasses and "is part of" for subunits, and associative ones such as "is caused by" or "in the literature often occurs close to" (the latter being derived from Medline).

The scope of the Metathesaurus is determined by the scope of the source vocabularies. If different vocabularies use different names for the same concept, or if they use the same name for different concepts, then this will be faithfully represented in the Metathesaurus. All hierarchical information from the source vocabularies is retained in the Metathesaurus. Metathesaurus concepts can also link to resources outside of the database, for instance gene sequence databases.

==== NCI Metathesaurus ====
The NCI Metathesaurus is product of the US National Cancer Institute's Enterprise Vocabulary Service, a collaborative effort of the NCI Center for Bioinformatics and the NCI Office of Communications. The NCI Metathesaurus is based on NLM's UMLS Metathesaurus supplemented with additional cancer-centric vocabulary. The public version of the NCI Metathesaurus currently contains all public domain vocabularies from the National Library of Medicine's UMLS Metathesaurus, as well as a growing number of NCI-specific vocabularies developed by the National Cancer Institute. The public version of the NCI Metathesaurus also contains proprietary vocabularies. Certain vocabularies, such as ICD-10 and ICD-O-3, are made available, by permission, for non-commercial use only. Others, specifically MedDRA, are made available subject to license restrictions.

=== Semantic network ===
Each concept in the Metathesaurus is assigned one or more semantic types (categories), which are linked with one another through semantic relationships. The semantic network is a catalog of these semantic types and relationships. This is a rather broad classification; there are 127 semantic types and 54 relationships in total.

The major semantic types are organisms, anatomical structures, biologic function, chemicals, events, physical objects, and concepts or ideas. The links among semantic types define the structure of the network and show important relationships between the groupings and concepts. The primary link between semantic types is the "isa" link, establishing a hierarchy of types. The network also has 5 major categories of non-hierarchical (or associative) relationships, which constitute the remaining 53 relationship types. These are "physically related to", "spatially related to", "temporally related to", "functionally related to" and "conceptually related to".

The information about a semantic type includes an identifier, definition, examples, hierarchical information about the encompassing semantic type(s), and associative relationships. Associative relationships within the Semantic Network are very weak. They capture at most some-some relationships, i.e. they capture the fact that some instance of the first type may be connected by the salient relationship to some instance of the second type. Phrased differently, they capture the fact that a corresponding relational assertion is meaningful (though it need not be true in all cases).

An example of an associative relationship is "may-cause", applied to the terms (smoking, lung cancer) would yield: smoking "may-cause" lung cancer.

=== SPECIALIST Lexicon ===
The SPECIALIST Lexicon contains information about common English vocabulary, biomedical terms, terms found in MEDLINE and terms found in the UMLS Metathesaurus. Each entry contains syntactic (how words are put together to create meaning), morphological (form and structure) and orthographic (spelling) information. A set of Java programs use the lexicon to work through the variations in biomedical texts by relating words by their parts of speech, which can be helpful in web searches or searches through an electronic medical record.

Entries may be one-word or multiple-word terms. Records contain four parts: base form (i.e. "run" for "running"); parts of speech (of which Specialist recognizes eleven); a unique identifier; and any available spelling variants. For example, a query for "anesthetic" would return the following:

{ base=anaesthetic
      spelling_variant=anesthetic
      entry=E0008769
          cat=noun
          variants=reg
}
{ base=anaesthetic
      spelling_variant=anesthetic
      entry=E0008770
          cat=adj
          variants=inv
          position=attrib(3)
}

The SPECIALIST lexicon is available in two formats. The "unit record" format can be seen above, and comprises slots and fillers. A slot is the element (i.e. "base=" or "spelling variant=") and the fillers are the values attributable to that slot for that entry. The "relational table" format is not yet normalized and contain a great deal of redundant data in the files.

== Inconsistencies and other errors ==
Given the size and complexity of the UMLS and its permissive policy on integrating terms, errors are inevitable. Errors include ambiguity and redundancy, hierarchical relationship cycles (a concept is both an ancestor and descendant to another), missing ancestors (semantic types of parent and child concepts are unrelated), and semantic inversion (the child/parent relationship with the semantic types is not consistent with the concepts).

These errors are discovered and resolved by auditing the UMLS. Manual audits can be very time-consuming and costly. Researchers have attempted to address the issue through a number of ways. Automated tools can be used to search for these errors. For structural inconsistencies (such as loops), a trivial solution based on the order would work. However, the same wouldn't apply when the inconsistency is at the term or concept level (context-specific meaning of a term). This requires an informed search strategy to be used (knowledge representation).

== Supporting software tools ==
In addition to the knowledge sources, the National Library of Medicine also provides supporting tools.

- MetamorphoSys - customizes the Metathesaurus for specific applications, for instance by excluding certain source vocabularies.
- lvg - a program that uses the SPECIALIST lexicon to generate lexical variants of a given term and to support the parsing of natural language text.
- MetaMap - online tool that, when given an arbitrary piece of text, finds and returns the relevant Metathesaurus concepts.
- MetaMap Transfer (MMTx) - Java implementation of MetaMap (no longer supported).
- Knowledge Source Server - web-based access to vocabularies (retired Fall 2010).

== Third party software ==
- UMLS-Similarity, an open source software package that implements many measures of semantic similarity and relatedness.
- UMLS-Similarity web interface, a web interface to UMLS-Similarity

== See also ==
- Medical classification
- Medical terminology
