= NLM =

NLM may stand for:

- National Liberation Movement (disambiguation)
- National Literacy Mission Programme, India, from 1988
- NetWare Loadable Module, by Novell
- Network Lock Manager, a Unix Network File System (NFS) protocol
- NLM CityHopper, a former Dutch airline
- NLM Nederlandse Luchtvaart Maatschappij, a former Dutch airline
- Norwegian Lutheran Mission
- No Lives Matter
- United States National Library of Medicine
