= Pathology Messaging Implementation Project =

Health project

Pathology Messaging Implementation Project (PMIP) is the project that introduced universal delivery of electronic pathology results to GPs in Great Britain. The resulting standard was formalised in 2003 as ISB 1557. It uses UN-EDIFACT based messages. More than 20 years later it remains extensively used by the British National Health Service (NHS) to transmit pathology orders and pathology test results.

PMIP began in the United Kingdom as the PMEP (Pathology Messaging Enabling Project) under the control of the NHS Information Authority and was supported by the Royal College of Pathologists (Dr Rick Jones), the Royal College of GPs (Dr Stephen Pill) and the British Medical Association. PMIP was designed for the transmission of structured pathology orders and their associated results between pathology and primary care systems. The message definition followed the work on standardisation led by Dr Jonathan Kay and Dr John McVittie and was implemented in UN-EDIFACT as required at the time by the Department of Health.

Originally messages were to be encrypted end-to-end (organisation-to-organisation) using public key infrastructure (PKI). The NHS subsequently moved to an alternative strategy using Data Transfer Service (DTS). Messages are encrypted from the pathology laboratory to the DTS server, and again from the DTS server to the General Practitioner using the PMIP interim messaging cryptographic service. The DTS provides application-to-application messaging within the NHS as well as providing a replacement for the X.400 service. It also provides easier development capability for the system suppliers at each end site.

All pathology tests and profiles are coded from the Read Codes, a clinical terminology originally developed by a General Practitioner, James Read, to describe all aspects of healthcare for his own use but subsequently adopted and further developed by the NHS. A small subset of the complete set of READ codes (which itself numbered 89,616 discrete codes by the time of its final update in 2016) was developed specifically for this project and then subsequently maintained as the Pathology Bounded Code List (PBCL). By its final release, also in 2016, this PBCL subset had grown to offer 3352 uniquely codable tests that can be requested and resulted. The PBCL content has since been mirrored into the UK Extension of SNOMED Clinical Terms (CT), an enhancement of the SNOMED CT (Systematized Nomenclature of Medicine) classification scheme, but the EDIFACT message syntax can not carry them due to their character length. The data must therefore be sent using the original 5-Character READ codes from the PBCL and then transcoded to a final SNOMED target code by the receiving system.

The electronic delivery of test results from clinical laboratories to clinical users is rightly seen as a service that can provide clinical benefit by speeding up diagnostic processes and ensuring accurate and timely delivery of critical clinical information. Such electronic transfers were begun in the UK and Europe in the early 1990s using various message standards including ASTM E1238. In the mid-1990s the NHS in the UK took the bold step of making this a universal feature of result delivery to general practice (GPs) and embarked on two linked projects to achieve this. In the first, the Pathology Messaging Enabler Project, standards were defined and infrastructure installed to link 200 laboratory systems to 8,500 GP systems. In the second project, the Pathology Messaging Implementation Project, these standards and the associated software was rolled out. By 2004 more than 35 million results messages were being transmitted each year and in 2007 some 50 million such messages were safely and securely delivered. During the 12 months to July 2023, 1.88 Billion discrete new EPR items added to electronic patient records held by UK GPs were expressed using a code from within the PBCL, accompanied (usually) by a value and a unit of measurement.

The PMIP EDIFACT+PBCL system remains the prevailing technology supporting all GP laboratory requesting and resulting across the entire UK, but the strategic national intent since the early 2020s has been to migrate all live GP systems to FHIR and the Unified Test List, a new and bespoke national extension of SNOMED CT offering greater detail. Although it is hoped this migration will remove the discordant standards used between UK primary and secondary care, as of August 2024 the migration has yet to begin.
