= Read code =

Medical code system used in the UK

Read codes are a clinical terminology system that was in widespread use in General Practice in the United Kingdom until around 2018, when NHS England switched to using SNOMED CT. Read codes in Scotland and in England were permitted for use in NHS secondary care settings, such as dentistry and mental health care until 31 March 2020. Read codes support detailed clinical encoding of multiple patient phenomena including: occupation; social circumstances; ethnicity and religion; clinical signs, symptoms and observations; laboratory tests and results; diagnoses; diagnostic, therapeutic or surgical procedures performed; and a variety of administrative items (e.g. whether a screening recall has been sent and by what communication modality, or whether an item of service fee has been claimed). It therefore includes but goes significantly beyond the expressivity of a diagnosis coding system.

== History ==
Since its origins in the 1980s, the system has evolved through three major technical design changes and significantly expanded its content.

=== Read version 1 (4-byte Read) ===
The first version was developed in the early 1980s by Dr James Read, a Loughborough general medical practitioner. The scheme was structured similarly to ICD-9:

- each code was composed of four consecutive characters: first character 0-9, A-Z (excepting I and O), remaining three characters 0-9, A-Z/a-z (excepting i,I,o and O) plus up to three trailing period '.' characters
- the relative position of one code to another was represented through the code itself: [J...] is the common ancestor of all other codes with 'J' as the first character, and [J1..] in turn the common ancestor of all codes beginning 'J1'.

Because of its four character code structure, Read Codes version 1 was more commonly known as 4-Byte Read. The first release was in April 1986; the final official release of 4-Byte Read occurred in April 2009.

=== Read version 2 (5-byte Read) ===
4-Byte Read could only encode a monoaxial hierarchy with a maximum of 4 hierarchical levels. The operational NHS requirement to provide a direct crossmap to both ICD-9-CM and OPCS-4 implied an additional hierarchical level was required. Accordingly, a new scheme was devised with exactly the same technical properties as 4-Byte Read except that the code structure was extended to 5-Bytes. This became known as Read2, or 5-Byte Read. The first release of 5-Byte Read occurred sometime prior to January 1991. The October 2010 release contained 82,967 discrete 5-byte codes (although the actual number of discrete clinical concepts that may be represented is estimated to be slightly lower - 82,593 - because of duplicate entries).

A later extension of Read version 2 product family was the co-publication of a drug and appliance dictionary. This follows the same technical structure (5-character alphanumeric codes with first character lower case alpha organised in a monohierarchy). Released every four weeks, the October 2010 release contained 52,316 codes.

A popular misconception is that all 4-Byte codes are also present in 5-Byte, where they will also carry the same meaning. Whilst in the majority of cases any 4-Byte code of the general form 'wxyz' will be equivalent to a 5-Byte code of the form 'wxyz.', there are notable exceptions. The 4-Byte code [E333 Fear of flying], for example, corresponds to 5-Byte [E202A Fear of flying]; no [E333.] code exists in 5-Byte Read at all.

=== NHS mandate ===
In 1988 a joint conference of the Royal College of General Practitioners and the British Medical Association recommended standardisation of the system in general practice Electronic Medical Record (EMR) systems and the National Health Service mandated this in April 1999. The intellectual property of the codes themselves was purchased outright by the UK government, and they have therefore been published under Crown Copyright ever since.

=== Read version 3 (Clinical Terms Version 3 or 'CTV3') ===
A third and more radically progressive version was devised through the 1990s in an attempt to address some of the more serious technical limitations of the earlier designs, including:

- Although codes remain 5-bytes in length, the hierarchical relationship between codes is no longer represented through the codes themselves but rather through a separate table listing all binary parent-child relations; this allows for a polyhierarchy of indefinite depth.
- Codes exist independently from the terms associated with them; terms now have their own 5-Byte code identifier, usually beginning with the letter 'Y'
- Both concept codes and term codes have a release status, thus allowing authoring errors to be corrected: concepts and terms may be moved to different places in the polyhierarchy between releases, or retired from the scheme (and hierarchy) altogether.
- A large scale professional consultation exercise, the 'Clinical Terms Project', was conducted to identify clinically valuable concepts that were not codable within version 2. This led to a significant expansion in the content of CTV3, including improved support for the various 'professions allied to medicine', such as speech therapy, physiotherapy and community nursing.
- CTV3 concepts can be qualified or 'post-coordinated' by the addition of further codes, to form compound expressions with more detailed semantics than may be expressed by any single code alone. For example, a procedure code can be associated via a laterality attribute code with a laterality value (left/right/bilateral).
- Many concepts were provided with partially modelled definitions. Thus, many surgical procedures have a 'site' relationship linking to the code for the anatomical target(s) of the procedure:

  e.g. 70266|Repair of acoustic nerve|:X9019|Site|=7N031|Vestibulocochlear nerve|
       or
       73143|Myringostapediopexy|:
             X9019|Site|=Xa18W|Tympanic membrane structure|,
             X9019|Site|=Xa8RI|Stapes structure|

The first release of Clinical Terms Version 3 occurred in the late 1990s. The October 2010 release contained 298,102 discrete concept codes of which 55,829 were marked as inactive, and 58,130 were pharmaceutical products or devices.

== Production and license ==
In the 1990s the Read codes were released on a quarterly basis for clinical terms, and monthly for drugs and appliances. Latterly, they were maintained by the UK Terminology Centre, a division within NHS Data Standards and Products (in turn a division of NHS Connecting for Health) and both versions were released biannually, in October and April, under the Open Government Licence.

License application, and distribution, are now electronic only via the UKTC Terminology Reference data Update Distribution service.

== Read and SNOMED ==
SNOMED CT was created in 2001 out of a technical, editorial and content merger of CTV3 and SNOMED RT, an American system. A significant part of the International Core content of SNOMED CT derives directly from CTV3; most of this content is identifiable as those SNOMED ConceptIDs where the CTV3ID column in the sct_concept table cites a code NOT beginning with the characters 'XU'.

Although CTV3 continues to be released biannually by the NHS independently of SNOMED CT, maintenance of both occurs in parallel; most concepts required to be added to CTV3 are as a matter of course simultaneously dual-authored into both CTV3 and the UK extension of SNOMED CT.

The NHS in England has committed to a strategic move to SNOMED CT, and systems using SNOMED are now being deployed within the NHS primary and secondary care estates. At the end of 2010, however, READ versions 2 and 3 remained the core clinical terminology used in UK primary care, with roughly 90% of the primary care estate still using version 2.

== Deprecation and withdrawal ==
In preparation for the whole English health system moving to SNOMED CT by April 2020, primary care systems were to have adopted the new nomenclature by April 2018. Secondary care, including Mental Health and Dentistry, was mandated to move to SNOMED by April 2020.

The former Information Standards Board for Health and Social Care (ISB) set December 2010 as the deprecation date for Read version 2, but did not set a date for its withdrawal at the time. In August 2014 the ISB's successor, the Standardisation Committee for Care Information (SCCI), formalised the withdrawal time frame of Read version 2: A final updated release for Read version 2 is to be made available on 1 April 2016, and will be withdrawn completely on 1 April 2020.

The deprecation and withdrawal time frame for Read version 3 was also agreed by the SCCI in August 2014. The deprecation date was set at 1 September 2014, with a final updated release for 1 April 2018, and complete withdrawal on 1 April 2020.

The Read Codes Drug and Appliance Dictionary (DAAD) was published for the final time on 1 April 2016, with data since being pulled from public circulation. The intent of NHS Digital is to migrate users to the Drugs and Medicines Dictionary (dm+d), which itself is based upon SNOMED CT.

== See also ==
- Pathology Messaging Implementation Project
