= Consumer Product Information Database =

Household products database

The Consumer Product Information Database (CPID), former Household Products Database, is a collection of information about chemical ingredients in a variety of household products marketed in the United States.

== Description ==
The Consumer Health Product Database is a web-based application that allows the public to search for specific products or specific chemical ingredients. It is a collection of publicly available information, mostly from product labels and Safety Data Sheets (former MSDS) provided by the product's manufacturer. It does not cover products whose ingredients are proprietary.

As of 2021, the collection includes more than 23,000 products. The preponderance of these products are marketed for home use in the United States, although some are for commercial settings and some are for customers in European countries. It does not cover food or medicines. It is maintained by DeLima Associates and receives funding from the National Institute of Environmental Health Sciences, part of the United States National Institutes of Health.

== History ==
The Consumer Product Information Database was initiated by DeLima Associates in 1994. By 2010, it was publicly available on DeLima's web site.

The Household Products Database, or Household Products Safety Database (HPD) for several years provided access to the CPID. The HPD was hosted on the National Library of Medicine's web site and the content was licensed from DeLima Associates. It was initially compiled in 1995, although some sources describe it as being launched in 2003. The National Library of Medicine announced the Household Products Database would be retired in December 2019, and instead directed users to the CPID web site.

== See also ==
- Environmental Working Group, which maintains a database of ingredients of cosmetics
- DailyMed, drug labels in the USA
