= EL++ =

EL++ is a lightweight description logic that was designed to

- capture the expressive power that is used by large-scale ontologies from practical applications
- have polytime reasoning problems, in particular classification and instance checking

_{(www.w3.org 2010)}

EL++ has been incorporated into OWL 2 as a OWL 2 EL Profile.
