= LOINC =

Database and universal standard

Logical Observation Identifiers Names and Codes (LOINC) is a database and universal standard for identifying medical laboratory observations. First developed in 1994, it was created and is maintained by the Regenstrief Institute, a US nonprofit medical research organization. LOINC was created in response to the demand for an electronic clinical care and management database and is publicly available at no cost.

It is endorsed by the American Clinical Laboratory Association. Since its inception, the database has expanded to include not just medical laboratory code names but also nursing diagnosis, nursing interventions, outcomes classification, and patient care data sets.

== Function ==
LOINC applies universal code names and identifiers to medical terminology related to electronic health records. The purpose is to assist in the electronic exchange and gathering of clinical results (such as laboratory tests, clinical observations, outcomes management and research). LOINC has two main parts: laboratory LOINC and clinical LOINC. Clinical LOINC contains a subdomain of Document Ontology which captures types of clinical reports and documents.

Several standards, such as IHE or HL7, use LOINC to electronically transfer results from different reporting systems to the appropriate healthcare networks. However, the health information enclosed is identified by a multiplicity of code values that may vary according to the entity producing those results. This has obvious disadvantages to the healthcare network that may need to adopt different codes to access and manage information coming from multiple sources. Managed care providers, for example, often have negotiated contracts that reimburse episodes of care and unique coding to trigger automated claim payment. Mapping each entity-specific code to its corresponding universal code can represent a significant investment of both human and financial capital.

A universal code system will enable facilities and departments across the world to receive and send results from their areas for comparison and consultation and may contribute toward a larger public health initiative of improving clinical outcomes and quality of care.

LOINC is one of the standards used in U.S. Federal Government systems for the electronic exchange of clinical health information. In 1999, it was identified by the HL7 Standards Development Organization as a preferred code set for laboratory test names in transactions between health care facilities, laboratories, laboratory testing devices, and public health authorities.

== Content ==
LOINC terminology has two main parts:

- Laboratory LOINC: It covers laboratory tests, microbiology tests (including antibiotic susceptibilities)
- Clinical LOINC: It covers a variety of non-lab concepts (ECG concepts, cardiac echo, obstetric ultrasound). Within clinical LOINC, there are also sup-parts for
  - Clinical documents: concepts for various types of clinical reports (e.g., discharge summary, well-child visit note)
  - Survey instruments: concepts for standardized surveys (e.g., Glasgow Coma Score, PHQ-9 depression scale)

== Format ==
A formal, distinct, and unique 6-part name is given to each term for test or observation identity. The database currently has over 71,000 observation terms that can be accessed and understood universally. Each database record includes six fields for the unique specification of each identified single test, observation, or measurement:

1. Component- what is measured, evaluated, or observed (example: urea,...)
2. Kind of property- characteristics of what is measured, such as length, mass, volume, time stamp and so on
3. Time aspect- interval of time over which the observation or measurement was made
4. System- context or specimen type within which the observation was made (example: blood, urine,...)
5. Type of scale- the scale of measure. The scale may be quantitative, ordinal, nominal, or narrative
6. Type of method- procedure used to make the measurement or observation

A unique code (format: nnnnn-n) is assigned to each entry upon registration. Other database fields include status and mapping information for database change management, synonyms, related terms, substance information (e.g. molar mass, CAS registry number), choices of answers for nominal scales, translations.

== Uses ==
Some of the advantages resulting from adopting LOINC may include improved communication in integrated healthcare delivery networks, improved community wide electronic health records, the automatic transfer to public health authorities of case reports for reportable diseases (e.g. for disease control or detection of epidemics), improved transfer of payment information for services rendered and a significant improvement in the overall quality of health care by reducing errors in the system.

The fact that universal standards are being promoted (if not adopted by national organizations and agencies) is an indication that the dialogue will continue regarding the development, structure, financing, monitoring, enforcement, and integration of standards within the broader health care system.

International interest in LOINC continues to grow. A number of efforts have been undertaken to translate the LOINC documents and terms into various languages, such as Simplified Chinese, German, Spanish. As of January, 2009, the software RELMA (Regenstrief LOINC Mapping Assistant) is available in separate downloads that contain an additional word index in Spanish, Simplified Chinese, or Korean, which allows searching in these languages in addition to English. Harmonization efforts between LOINC and SNOMED CT were initiated in 2012.

== See also ==
- NPU terminology
- SNOMED CT
- CDA
- CDISC
- Clinical Care Classification System
- DICOM
- DOCLE
- HL7
- Public Health Information Network
- UMLS
- Controlled vocabulary
