= SNOMED CT =

System for medical classification

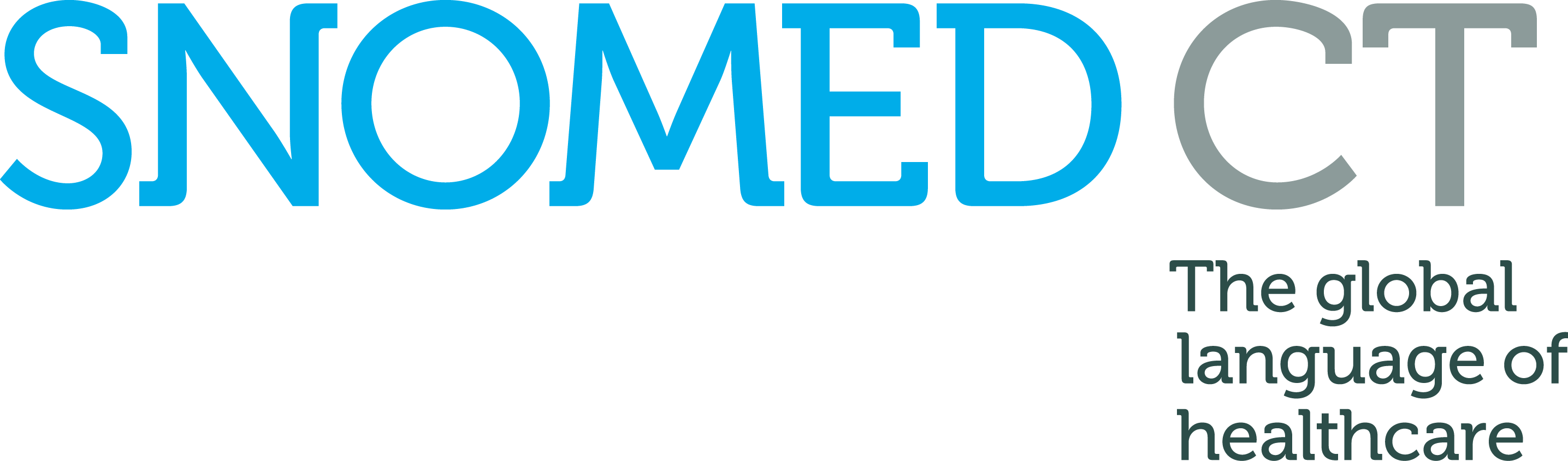

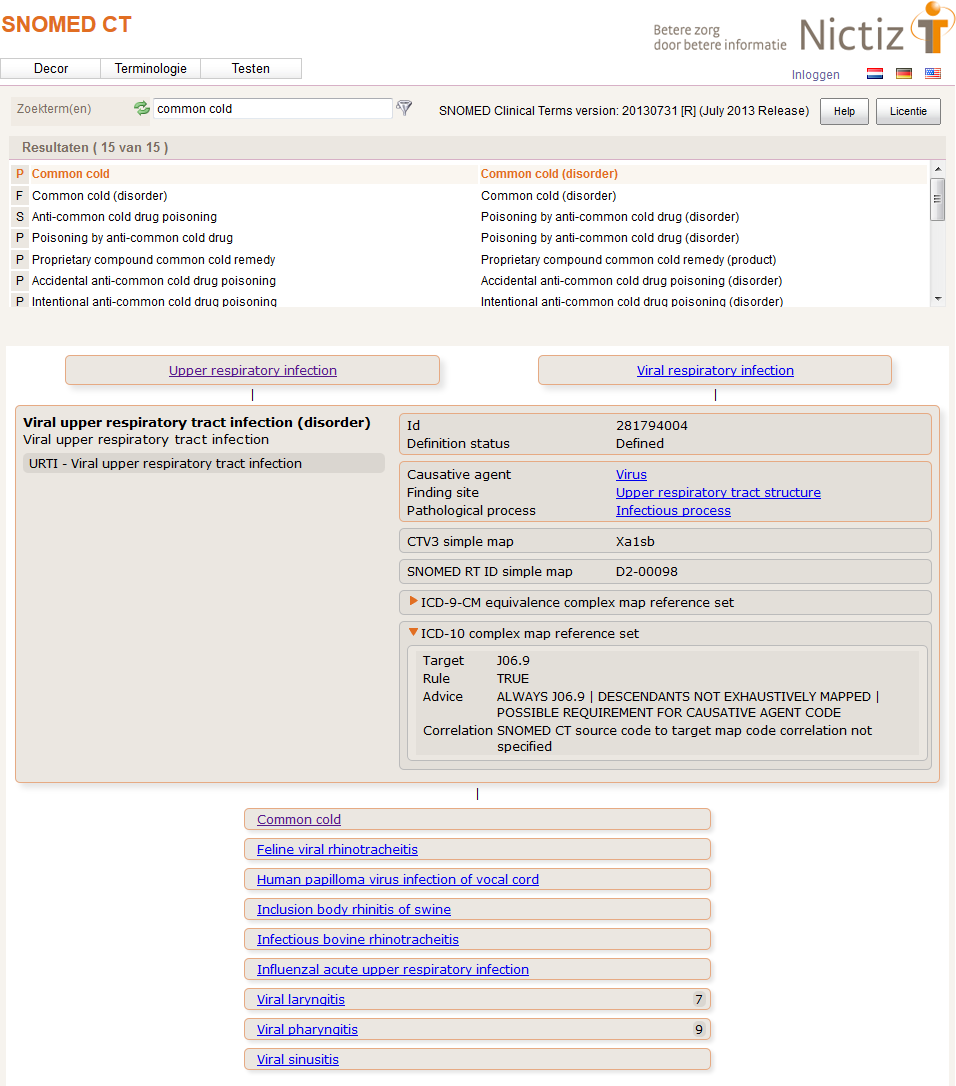
- Screenshot of a SNOMED browser
- Developer: SNOMED International
- Type: medical terms
- Website: www.snomed.org
- As of: 2007

SNOMED CT or SNOMED Clinical Terms is a systematically organized computer-processable collection of medical terms providing codes, terms, synonyms and definitions used in clinical documentation and reporting. SNOMED CT is considered to be the most comprehensive, multilingual clinical healthcare terminology in the world. The primary purpose of SNOMED CT is to encode the meanings that are used in health information and to support the effective clinical recording of data with the aim of improving patient care. SNOMED CT provides the core general terminology for electronic health records. SNOMED CT comprehensive coverage includes: clinical findings, symptoms, diagnoses, procedures, body structures, organisms and other etiologies, substances, pharmaceuticals, devices and specimens.

SNOMED CT is maintained and distributed by SNOMED International, an international non-profit standards development organization, located in London, UK. SNOMED International is the trading name of the International Health Terminology Standards Development Organisation (IHTSDO), established in 2007.

SNOMED CT provides for consistent information interchange and is fundamental to an interoperable electronic health record. It provides a consistent means to index, store, retrieve, and aggregate clinical data across specialties and sites of care. It also helps in organizing the content of electronic health records systems by reducing the variability in the way data are captured, encoded and used for clinical care of patients and research. SNOMED CT can be used to directly record clinical details of individuals in electronic patient records. It also provides the user with a number of linkages to clinical care pathways, shared care plans and other knowledge resources, in order to facilitate informed decision-making, and to support long-term patient care. The availability of free automatic coding tools and services, which can return a ranked list of SNOMED CT descriptors to encode any clinical report, could help healthcare professionals to navigate the terminology.

SNOMED CT is a terminology that can cross-map to other international standards and classifications. Specific language editions are available which augment the international edition and can contain language translations, as well as additional national terms. For example, SNOMED CT-AU, released in December 2009 in Australia, is based on the international version of SNOMED CT, but encompasses words and ideas that are clinically and technically unique to Australia.

== History ==
SNOMED started in 1965 as a Systematized Nomenclature of Pathology (SNOP) and was further developed into a logic-based health care terminology.

SNOMED CT was created in 1999 by the merger, expansion and restructuring of two large-scale terminologies: SNOMED Reference Terminology (SNOMED RT), developed by the College of American Pathologists (CAP); and the Clinical Terms Version 3 (CTV3) (formerly known as the Read codes), developed by the National Health Service of the United Kingdom (NHS). The final product was released in January 2002. The International Health Terminology Standards Development Organisation now considers SNOMED CT to be a brand name rather than an acronym. Previously SNOMED was an acronym of Systematized Nomenclature Of Medicine, but it lost that meaning when SNOMED was combined with CTV3 (Clinical Terms Version 3) into the merged product called SNOMED Clinical Terms, which was shortened to SNOMED CT.

The historical strength of SNOMED was its coverage of medical specialties. SNOMED RT, with over 120,000 concepts, was designed to serve as a common reference terminology for the aggregation and retrieval of pathology health care data recorded by multiple organizations and individuals. The strength of CTV3 was its terminologies for general practice. CTV3, with 200,000 interrelated concepts, was used for storing structured information about primary care encounters in individual, patient-based records. The January 2020 release of the SNOMED CT International Edition included more than 350,000 concepts.

In July 2003, the National Library of Medicine (NLM), on behalf of the United States Department of Health and Human Services, entered into an agreement with the College of American Pathologists to make SNOMED CT available to U.S. users at no cost through the National Library of Medicine's Unified Medical Language System UMLS Metathesaurus. The NLM negotiation team was led by Betsy Humphreys, and the contract provided NLM with a perpetual license for the core SNOMED CT (in Spanish and English) and its ongoing updates.

In April 2007, SNOMED CT intellectual property rights were transferred from the CAP to the International Health Terminology Standards Development Organisation (IHTSDO) in order to promote international adoption and use of SNOMED CT. Now trading as SNOMED International, the organization is responsible for "ongoing maintenance, development, quality assurance, and distribution of SNOMED CT" internationally and its Membership consists of a number of the world's leading e-health countries and territories, including: Argentina, Australia, Belgium, Brunei, Canada, Czech Republic, Chile, Denmark, Estonia, Hong Kong, Iceland, India, Ireland, Israel, Lithuania, Malaysia, Malta, Netherlands, New Zealand, Norway, Poland, Portugal, Singapore, Slovak Republic, Republic of Slovenia, Spain, Sweden, Switzerland, United Kingdom, United States and Uruguay.

SNOMED CT is a multinational and multilingual terminology, which can manage different languages and dialects. SNOMED CT is currently available in American English, British English, Spanish, Danish and Swedish, with other translations underway or nearly completed in French and Dutch. SNOMED CT cross maps to other terminologies, such as: ICD-9-CM, ICD-10, ICD-O-3, ICD-10-AM, Laboratory LOINC and OPCS-4. It supports ANSI, DICOM, HL7, and ISO standards.

== Structure ==
SNOMED CT consists of four primary core components:

1. Concept Codes – numerical codes that identify clinical terms, primitive or defined, organized in hierarchies
2. Descriptions – textual descriptions of Concept Codes
3. Relationships – relationships between Concept Codes that have a related meaning
4. Reference Sets – used to group Concepts or Descriptions into sets, including reference sets and cross-maps to other classifications and standards.

SNOMED CT "Concepts" are representational units that categorize all the things that characterize healthcare processes and need to be recorded therein. In 2011, SNOMED CT included more than 311,000 concepts, which are uniquely identified by a concept ID, e.g. the concept 22298006 refers to Myocardial infarction. All SNOMED CT concepts are organized into acyclic taxonomic (is-a) hierarchies; for example, Viral pneumonia IS-A Infectious pneumonia IS-A Pneumonia IS-A Lung disease. Concepts may have multiple parents, for example Infectious pneumonia is also a child of Infectious disease. The taxonomic structure allows data to be recorded and later accessed at different levels of aggregation. SNOMED CT concepts are linked by approximately 1,360,000 links, called relationships.

Concepts are further described by various clinical terms or phrases, called Descriptions, which are divided into Fully Specified Names (FSNs), Preferred Terms (PTs), and Synonyms. Each Concept has exactly one FSN, which is unique across all of SNOMED CT. It has, in addition, exactly one PT, which has been decided by a group of clinicians to be the most common way of expressing the meaning of the concept. It may have zero to many Synonyms. Synonyms are additional terms and phrases used to refer to this concept. They do not have to be unique or unambiguous.

=== Semantic tag ===
SNOMED CT assigns each concept a semantic tag. It is present in parentheses in Fully Specified Name of each concept. There can be multiple semantic tags used within each SNOMED CT top level hierarchy. For example, top level hierarchy of Pharmaceutical/biologic Product uses semantic tags of: product, medicinal product, medicinal product form and clinical drug. Only one semantic tag can be used for each concept.

=== The formal model underlying SNOMED CT ===
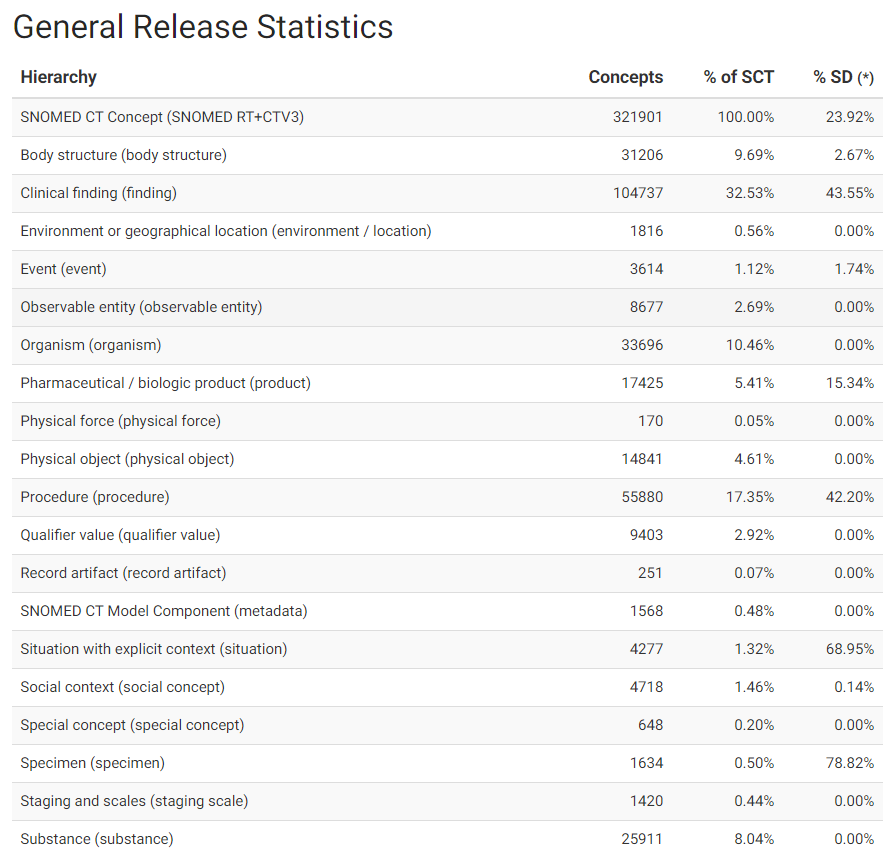
SNOMED CT statistics (as of November 2016). SD stands for sufficiently defined.

SNOMED CT can be characterized as a multilingual thesaurus with an ontological foundation. Thesaurus-like features are concept–term relations such as the synonymous descriptions "Acute coryza", "Acute nasal catarrh", "Acute rhinitis", "Common cold" (as well as Spanish "resfrío común" and "rinitis infecciosa") for the concept 82272006.

Under ontological scrutiny, SNOMED-CT is a class hierarchy (with extensive overlap of classes in contrast to typical statistical classifications like ICD). This means that the SNOMED CT concept 82272006 defines the class of all the individual disease instances that match the criteria for "common cold" (e.g., one patient may have "head cold" noted in their record, and another may have "Acute coryza"; both can be found as instances of "common cold"). The superclass (Is-A) Relation relates classes in terms of inclusion of their members. That is, all individual "cold-processes" are also included in all superclasses of the class Common Cold, such as Viral upper respiratory tract infection (Figure).

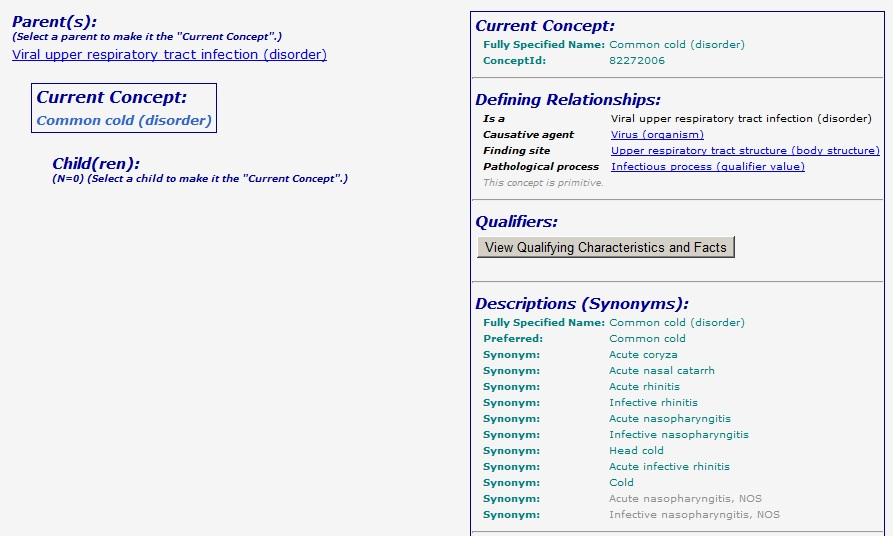
Common cold as a primitive concept in SNOMED CT

SNOMED CT's relational statements are basically triplets of the form Concept_{1} – Relation_{x} – Concept_{2}, with Relation_{x} being from a small number of relation types (called linkage concepts), e.g. finding site, due to, etc. The interpretation of these triplets is (implicitly) based on the semantics of a simple Description logic (DL). E.g., the triplet Common Cold – causative agent – Virus, corresponds to the first-order expression

forall x: instance-of (x, Common cold) -> exists y: instance-of (y, Virus) and causative-agent (y, x)

or the more intuitive DL expression

Common cold subClassOf causative-agent some Virus

In the Common cold example, the concept description is "primitive", which means that necessary criteria are given that must be met for each instance, without being sufficient for classifying a disorder as an instance of Common Cold . In contrast, the example Viral upper respiratory tract infection depicts a fully described concept, which is represented in description logic as follows:

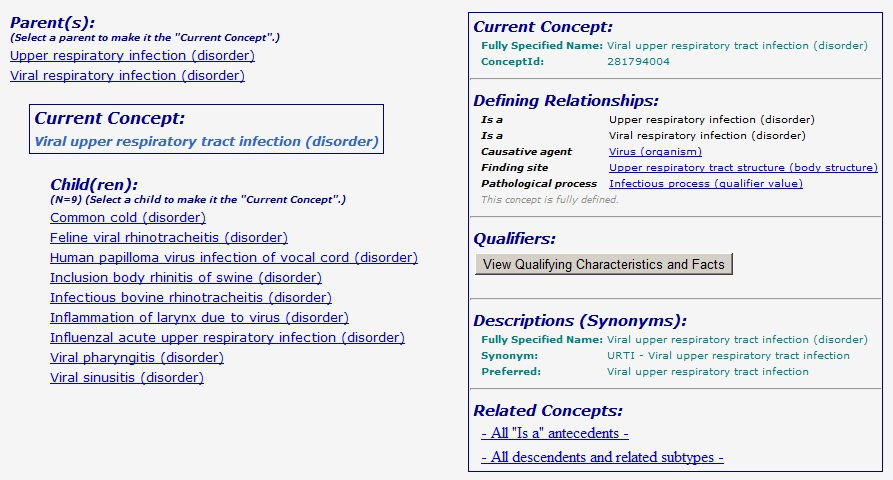
Viral upper respiratory tract infection as a defined concept in SNOMED CT

 Viral upper respiratory tract infection equivalentTo
  Upper respiratory infection and Viral respiratory infection and
   Causative-agent some Virus and
   Finding-site some Upper respiratory tract structure and
   Pathological-process some Infectious process

This means that every individual disorder for which all definitional criteria are met can be classified as an instance of Viral upper respiratory tract infection.

=== Description logics ===
As of 2021, SNOMED CT content limits itself to a subset of the EL++ formalism, restricting itself to the following operators:

- Top, bottom
- Primitive roles and concepts with asserted parent(s) for each
- Concept definition and conjunction but NOT disjunction or negation
- Role hierarchy but not role composition
- Domain and range constraints
- Existential but not universal restriction
- A restricted form of role inclusion axiom (xRy ^ ySz => xRz)
- General Concept Inclusion axioms (A ⊆ B).

For understanding the modelling, it is also important to look at the stated view of a concept versus the inferred view of the concept. In further considering the state view, SNOMED CT used in the past a modelling approach referred to as 'proximal parent' approach. After 2015, a superior approach called "proximal primitive parent" has been adopted.

=== Precoordination and postcoordination ===
SNOMED CT provides a compositional syntax that can be used to create expressions that represent clinical ideas which are not explicitly represented by SNOMED CT concepts. This mechanism exists because it is challenging to create and maintain all possible concepts upfront (as precoordinated concepts).

For example, there is no explicit concept for a "third degree burn of left index finger caused by hot water". However, using the compositional syntax it can be represented as

284196006 | burn of skin | :
   116676008 | associated morphology | = 80247002 | third degree burn injury |
 , 272741003 | laterality | = 7771000 | left |
 , 246075003 | causative agent | = 47448006 | hot water |
 , 363698007 | finding site | = 83738005 | index finger structure

Such expressions are said to have been 'postcoordinated'. Post-coordination avoids the need to create large numbers of defined Concepts within SNOMED CT. However, many systems only allow for precoordinated representations. Reliable analysis and comparison of post-coordinated expressions is possible using appropriate algorithms machinery to efficiently process the expression taking account of the underlying description logic.

Major Electronic Health Record Systems (EHRS) have repeatedly complained to IHTSDO and other standards organizations about the "complexity" of post-coordinated expressions.

For example, the postcoordinated expression above can be transformed using a set of standard rules to the following "normal form expression" which enables comparison with similar concepts.

64572001 | disease | :
   246075003 | causative agent | = 47448006 | hot water |
 , 363698007 | finding site | = ( 83738005 | index finger structure | :
          272741003 | laterality | = 7771000 | left | )
 , { 116676008 | associated morphology | = 80247002 | third degree burn injury |
 , 363698007 | finding site | = 39937001 | skin structure | }

Postcoordination is an important desirable feature of a terminology. Prior 2020, International Classification of Diseases (ICD) did not allow post-coordination and SNOMED CT was the only terminology that supported postcoordination. Since 2020, a new version of ICD-11 now also supports postcoordination.

=== Veterinary content ===
The International Edition of SNOMED CT only includes human terms. In 2014, clearly veterinary concepts were moved into a SNOMED CT veterinary extension. This extension is managed by the Veterinary Terminology Services Lab at the Va-Md College of Veterinary Medicine at Virginia Tech.

=== Known deficiencies and mitigation strategies ===
Earlier SNOMED versions had faceted structure ordered by semantic axes, requiring that more complex situations required to be coded by a coordination of different codes. This had two major shortcomings. On the one hand, the necessity of post-coordination was perceived as a user-unfriendly obstacle, which has certainly contributed to the low adoption of early SNOMED versions. On the other hand, uniform coding was difficult to obtain. E.g., Acute appendicitis could be post-coordinated in three different ways with no means to compute semantic equivalences. SNOMED RT had addressed this problem by introducing description logic formula. With the addition of CTV3 many concepts were redefined using formal expressions. However, the fusion with CTV3, as a historically grown terminology with many close-to user descriptions, introduced some problems which still affect SNOMED CT. In addition to a confusing taxonomic web of many hierarchical levels with massive multiple inheritance (e.g. there are 36 taxonomic ancestors for Acute appendicitis), many ambiguous, context-dependent concepts have found their way into SNOMED CT. Pre-coordination was sometimes pushed to extremes, so there are, for example, 350 different concepts for burns found on the head.

A further phenomenon which characterizes parts of SNOMED CT is the so-called epistemic intrusion. In principle, the task of terminology (and even an ontology) should be limited to providing context-free term or class meanings. The contextualization of these representational units should be ideally the task of an information model. Human language is misleading here, as we use syntactically similar expression to represent categorically distinct entities, e.g. Ectopic pregnancy vs. Suspected pregnancy. The first one refers to a real pregnancy, the second one to a piece of (uncertain) information. In SNOMED CT most (but not all) of these context-dependent concepts are concentrated in the subhierachy Situation with explicit context. A major reason for why such concepts cannot be dispensed with is that SNOMED CT takes on, in many cases, the functionality of information models, as the latter do not exist in a given implementation.

With the establishment of IHTSDO, SNOMED CT became more accessible to a wider audience. Criticism of the state of the terminology was sparked by numerous substantive weaknesses as well as on the lack of quality assurance measures. From the beginning IHTSDO was open regarding such (also academic) criticism. In the last few years considerable progress has been made regarding quality assurance and tooling.

The need for a more principled ontological foundation was gradually accepted, as well as a better understanding of description logic semantics. Redesign priorities were formulated regarding observables, disorders, findings, substances, organisms etc. Translation guidelines were elaborated as well as guidelines for content submission requests and a strategy for the inclusion of pre-coordinated content. There are still known deficiencies regarding the "ontological commitment" of SNOMED CT, e.g., the clarification of which kind of entity is an instance of a given SNOMED CT concept. The same term can be interpreted as a disorder or a patient with a disorder, for example Tumour might denote a process or a piece of tissue; Allergy may denote an allergic reaction or just an allergic disposition. A more recent strategy is the use of rigorously typed upper-level ontologies to disambiguate SNOMED CT content.

The increased take-up of SNOMED CT for research into applications in daily use across the world to support patient care is leading to a larger engaged community. This has led to an increase in the resource allocated to authoring SNOMED CT terms as well as to an increase in collaboration to take SNOMED CT into a robust industry used standard. This is leading to an increase in the number of software tools and development of materials that contribute to knowledge base to support implementation. Several on-line communities that focus on particular aspects of SNOMED CT and its implementation are also developing.

In theory, description logic reasoning can be applied to any new candidate post-coordinated expressions in order to assess whether it is a parent or ancestor of, a child or other descendant of, or semantically equivalent to any existing concept from the existing pre-coordinated concepts. However, partly as the continuing fall-out from the merger with CTV3, SNOMED still contains undiscovered semantically duplicate primitive and defined concepts. Additionally, many concepts remain primitive whilst their semantics can also be legitimately defined in terms of other primitives and roles concurrently in the system. Because of these omissions and actual or possible redundancies of semantic content, real-world performance of algorithms to infer subsumption or semantic equivalence will be unpredictably imperfect.

=== SNOMED CT validation ===
Using consistent rules is important for the quality of SNOMED CT. To that end, in 2009, a prototype Machine Readable Concept Model (MRCM) was created by the SNOMED CT team. In a follow-up work, this model is being revised to utilize SNOMED CT expression constraints.

=== SNOMED CT and other terminologies ===
==== SNOMED CT and ICD ====
SNOMED CT is a clinical terminology designed to capture and represent patient data for clinical purposes. The International Statistical Classification of Diseases and Related Health Problems (ICD) is an internationally used medical classification system; which is used to assign diagnostic and, in some national modifications, procedural codes in order to produce coded data for statistical analysis, epidemiology, reimbursement and resource allocation. Both systems use standardized definitions and form a common medical language used within electronic health record (EHR) systems. SNOMED CT enables information input into an EHR system during the course of patient care, while ICD facilitates information retrieval, or output, for secondary data purposes. In 2010s, the advantage of SNOMED CT over ICD was the multiple parent hierarchy of SNOMED CT. Since 2020 release of ICD 11, this advantage is less important because ICD-11 foundational level allows an ICD 11 concept to have multiple parents.

	SNOMED CT	ICD (Mortality and Morbidity Statistics view)
Type	Terminology System	Classification System
Purpose	Information Input	Information Output
Function	Describes and defines clinical information for primary data purposes	Aggregates and categorizes clinical information for secondary data purposes

==== SNOMED CT and LOINC ====
LOINC is a terminology that contains laboratory tests. Since 2017, SNOMED International started creating terms for LOINC components and created a set of SNOMED CT expressions that capture the meaning of many LOINC terms.

==== SNOMED CT and MedDRA ====
There is overlap between MedDRA and SNOMED CT that is not beneficial for pharmaceutical industry. In 2021, two maps map between SNOMED CT and MedDRA were jointly published by both organizations (from SNOMED CT to MedDRA and from MedDRA to SNOMED CT).

== Use ==
SNOMED CT is used in several different ways, some of which are:

- It captures clinical information at the level of detail needed for the provision of healthcare
- Through sharing data, it can reduce the need to repeat health history at each new encounter with a healthcare professional
- Information can be recorded by different people in different locations and combined into simple information views within the patient record
- Use of a common terminology decreases the potential for differing interpretation of information
- Structured Data Capture medical forms and questionnaires based on the FHIR standard
- Electronic recording in a common way reduces errors and can help to ensure completeness in recording all relevant data
- Standardised information makes analysis easier, supporting quality, cost effective practice, research and future clinical guideline development
- A clinical terminology allows a health care provider to identify patients based on specified coded information, and more effectively manage screening, treatment and follow up

=== Use cases ===
More specifically, the following sample computer applications use SNOMED CT:

- Electronic Health Record Systems
- Computerized Provider Order Entry CPOE such as E-Prescribing or Laboratory Order Entry
- Catalogues of clinical services; e.g., for Diagnostic Imaging procedures
- Knowledge databases used in clinical decision support systems (CDSS)
- Remote Intensive Care Unit Monitoring
- Laboratory Reporting
- Emergency Room Charting
- Cancer Reporting
- Genetic Databases

=== Access ===
SNOMED CT is maintained and distributed by SNOMED International, an international non-profit standards development organization, located in London, UK.

The use of SNOMED CT in production systems requires a license. There are two types of license:

1. Country/territory membership in SNOMED International (charged according to gross national product).
2. Affiliate license (dependent on the number of end users). LDCs (least developed countries) can use SNOMED CT without charges.

For scientific research in medical informatics, for demonstrations or evaluation purposes SNOMED CT sources can be freely downloaded and used. The original SNOMED CT sources in tabular form are accessible by registered users of the Unified Medical Language System (UMLS) who have signed an agreement. Numerous online and offline browsers are available.

Those wishing to obtain a license for its use and to download SNOMED CT should contact their National Release Centre, links to which are provided on the IHTSDO website.

==== License free subsets ====
To facilitate adoption of SNOMED CT and use of SNOMED CT in other standards, there are license free subsets. For example, a set of 7 314 codes and descriptions is free for use by users of DICOM-compliant software (without restriction to IHTSDO member countries).

==== Global Patient Set (GPS) subset ====
GPS was released in Sep 2019 and contains 21 782 concepts.

== Top level concepts ==
SNOMED CT concepts typically belong to a single hierarchy (with the exception of drug-device combined concepts). Some hierarchies, have a concept model defined (e.g., clinical findings). For other domains (e.g., Organism, Substance, Qualifier value), there is no concept model yet defined.

=== Procedure ===
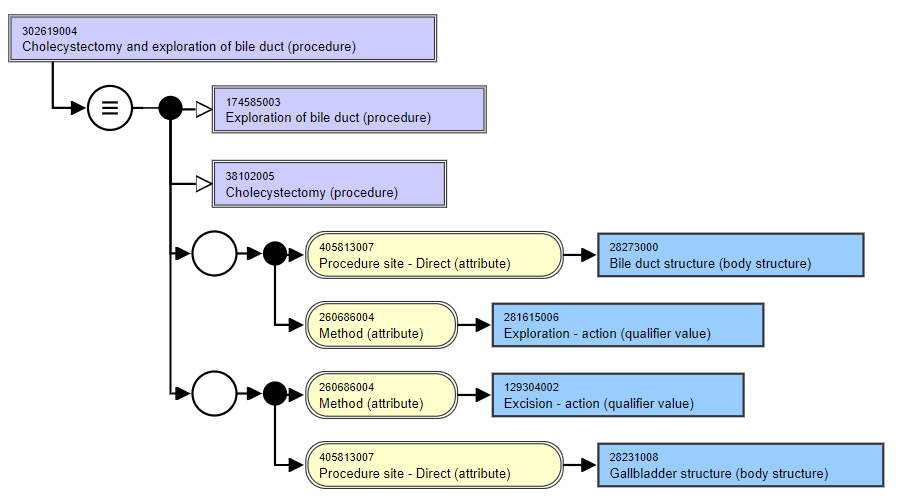
Procedure example

Concept in this hierarchy represent procedures performed on a patient. There is a well-established defined concept model for procedures. Procedure site (direct or indirect) specifies on what part of body the procedure is performed. A separate set of rules exist for evaluation procedures. Evaluation procedures are procedures where evidence is evaluated to support the determination of a value, inference or conclusion. Evaluation procedures have additional attributes, such as 'Has specimen','Property' or 'Measurement method'.

=== Event ===
As of 2016, the Event hierarchy does not have a concept model defined. In 2006, some concepts from the 'Clinical Finding' hierarchy were moved to the Event hierarchy. Those concepts retained some of their attributes. (e.g., causative agent)

=== Observable entities ===
SNOMED International is working on creating a concept model for observable entities.

=== Body Structure ===
Body parts represent one of the largest hierarchies within SNOMED CT. The modeling is based on Foundational Model of Anatomy but it differs from the model in some aspects (e.g., region is taken as 3D region and not a 2D region). Important attributes include: 'Laterality', several types of 'Part of' relationships, and 'Is a'.

=== Pharmaceutical / biologic product ===
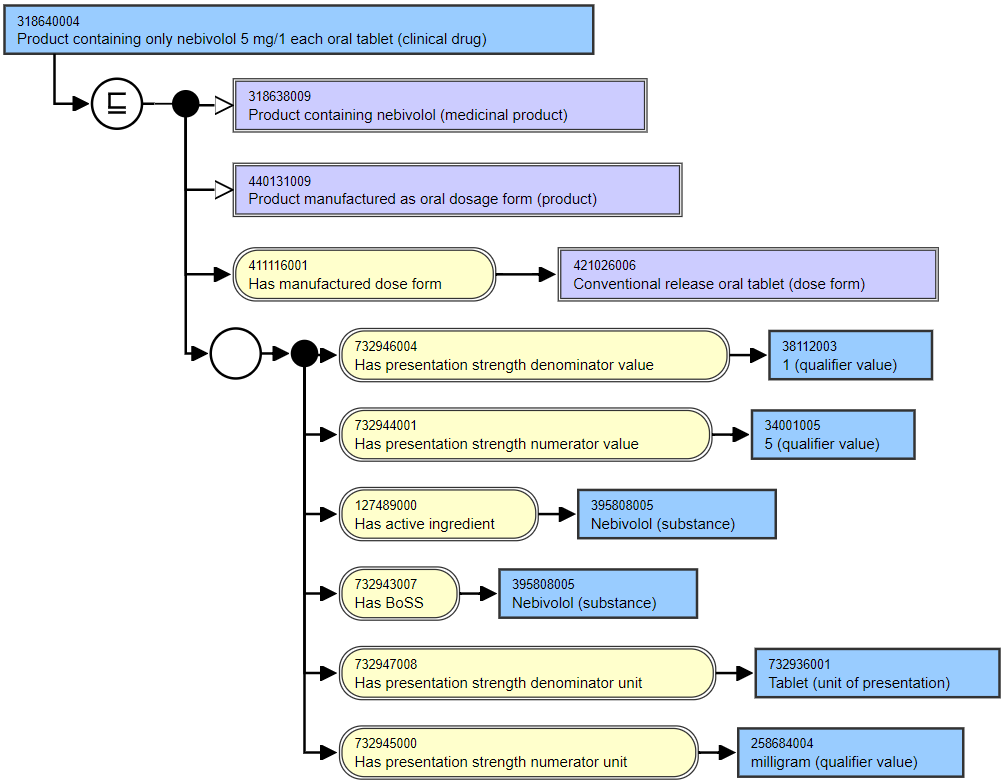
Pharmaceutical product example

Pharmaceutical and biologic products are modeled using constructs of active ingredient, presentation strength, and basis of strength. Since 2018, harmonization of SNOMED CT drug content with IDMP standard is an editorial goal. The following types of entities are present:

==== Medicinal product ====
A higher level term grouping drugs. For example, 398731002 | Product containing sulfamethoxazole and trimethoprim (medicinal product) |

==== Clinical Drug ====
Concept that represents a concrete drug product as used in clinical practice. For example, 317335000 | Product containing precisely esomeprazole 20milligram/1 each conventional release oral tablet (clinical drug)|

==== Dose Form ====
Concept representing how the product is delivered. For example, 385219001 | Conventional release solution for injection (dose form) |.

== Authoring conventions ==
A goal for SNOMED CT is consistency. Several mechanisms are employed to ensure this. Machine readable concept model is used to check for compliance with a set of rules. Rules for creating fully specified name for a concept define allowed and not allowed patterns. When defining a concept, a proximal primitive parent rule is used (in stated definition) to employ best description logic derived classification of concepts.

Separate conventions govern grouping of relationships. Ability to group related relationships is an important strength of SNOMED CT. Rules in Machine Readable Concept Model (MRCM) specify by domain which relationships are never grouped (e.g., 'Is a' or 'Laterality' attributes) and which relationships are always grouped (e.g., 'Finding site'). For correct subsumption inference, some relationships may be in a group but consist of a single relationship.

Another convention for SNOMED CT international edition is to avoid creating intermediate primitive concepts (unless medically necessary and impossible to define with existing concept model). An intermediate primitive (=not defined) concept is a non-defined concept that has children concepts and parent concepts. This convention is related to the use of description logic to facilitate terminology maintenance. Because primitive concepts can not be processed by the description logic classifier, the maintenance of such concepts relies solely on human editors. Adding new intermediate primitive concepts requires changes to all affected concepts and is demanding in terms of terminology maintenance.

== See also ==
- CDISC
- Clinical Care Classification System
- DOCLE
- EN 13606
- MEDCIN
- MedDRA
- Omaha System
- ICD11
- Foundational Model of Anatomy
