= College of American Pathologists =

Physician organization

- Abbreviation: CAP
- Type: NGO
- Legal status: 501(c)(6) Nonprofit
- Purpose: Physician Membership, Advocacy, Laboratory Improvement, and Laboratory Accreditation
- Headquarters: Northfield, Illinois
- Members: Approximately 19,000
- President: Qihui “Jim” Zhai, MD, FCAP
- Interim CEO: Akshay Patel
- Staff: Approximately 650
- Website: http://www.cap.org/

The College of American Pathologists (CAP) is a member-based physician organization founded in 1946, comprising approximately 18,000 board-certified pathologists. It serves patients, pathologists, and the public by fostering and advocating best practices in pathology and laboratory medicine.

It is the world's largest association composed exclusively of pathologists certified by the American Board of Pathology, and is widely considered the leader in laboratory quality assurance. The CAP is an advocate for high-quality and cost-effective medical care. The CAP currently inspects and accredits medical laboratories under authority from the Centers for Medicare & Medicaid Services. Their standards have been called "the toughest and most exacting in the medical business." The CAP provides resources and guidance to laboratories seeking accreditation in programs for biorepositories, genomics, ISO 15189, and more. In November 2008, Piedmont Medical Laboratory of Winchester, Virginia became the first laboratory in the United States to be officially accredited under ISO 15189.

The CAP provides accreditation and proficiency testing to medical laboratories through its laboratory quality solutions programs. Early versions of proficiency testing—known as surveys—which laboratories use to help test and ensure accuracy, were first initiated in 1949. Laboratories first began receiving CAP accreditation in 1964, and the organization was later given authority to accredit medical laboratories as a result of the Clinical Laboratory Improvement Amendments of 1988.

The CAP publishes checklists containing requirements pertaining to the performance of laboratory tests. The All Common Checklist (COM) contains a core set of requirements that apply to all areas performing laboratory tests and procedures. Some requirements exist in both the COM checklist and in a discipline-specific checklist, but with a different checklist note that has a more specific requirement. In these situations, the discipline-specific requirement takes precedence over the COM requirement. The COM checklist also describes the requirements for analytical validation/verification of the method performance specifications (i.e. accuracy, precision, reportable range) that laboratories must perform for each test, method, or instrument system before use in patient testing. CAP has also created programs that look at the frequency of errors throughout laboratory testing, including Q-Probes and Q-Tracks. CAP's Q-Probes studies aim to describe errors at different stages of testing; pre-analytic, analytic, and post-analytic. In order to reduce the frequency of errors occurring at the different stages of testing, performance measures have been put in place in order to improve patient safety. CAP has created a database to record the error rates seen from more than 130 inter-laboratory studies.

The CAP opened a Washington, DC, office in 1970 and advocating for pathology in a legal and policy-oriented capacity remains a core mission of the organization, both through direct action and programs that connect pathologists to legislators.

The CAP Foundation is the philanthropic arm of the organization and is classified as a 501(c)(3) charitable entity. Its flagship program, See, Test & Treat, partners with hospitals and clinicians to provide free cancer and HPV screening, as well as educational events, to underserved communities. The program served over 900 women in 2017.

== Minimum periods of retention ==
CAP and Clinical Laboratory Improvement Amendments. have written policies for the minimum period of that laboratories should keep laboratory records and materials, with some examples as follows:

| Microscopy slides | Histology and non-forensic autopsy | 10 years |
| Microscopy slides | Forensic autopsy | Indefinite |
| Microscopy slides | Cytology, fine needle aspiration | 10 years |
| Microscopy slides | Cytology, apart from fine needle aspiration | 5 years |
| Paraffin-embedded blocks | Non-forensic | 2 or 10 years |
| Paraffin-embedded blocks | Forensic | Indefinite |
| Requisition form and test report | Pathology reports | 10 years |
| Requisition form and test report | Other | 2 years |
| Blood bank records | Quality control records | 5 years |
| Blood bank records | Donor and recipient records | 10 years |
| Blood bank records | Records of indefinitely deferred donors | Indefinite |
| Wet tissues | | Until report is completed or 2 weeks thereafter |
| Proficiency testing records and quality management/quality control records | | 2 years |
| Discontinued procedures | | 2 years |
| Blood smears and other body fluid smears, microbiology slides (including Gram stains) | | 7 days |
| Flow cytometry plots | | 10 years |

== See also ==
- American Society for Clinical Pathology (ASCP)
- Anatomic pathology
- Clinical pathology
- Systematized Nomenclature of Medicine
