= United States National Library of Medicine =

World's largest medical library

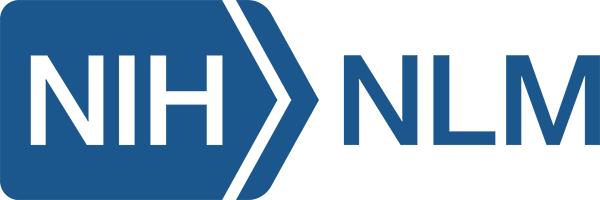

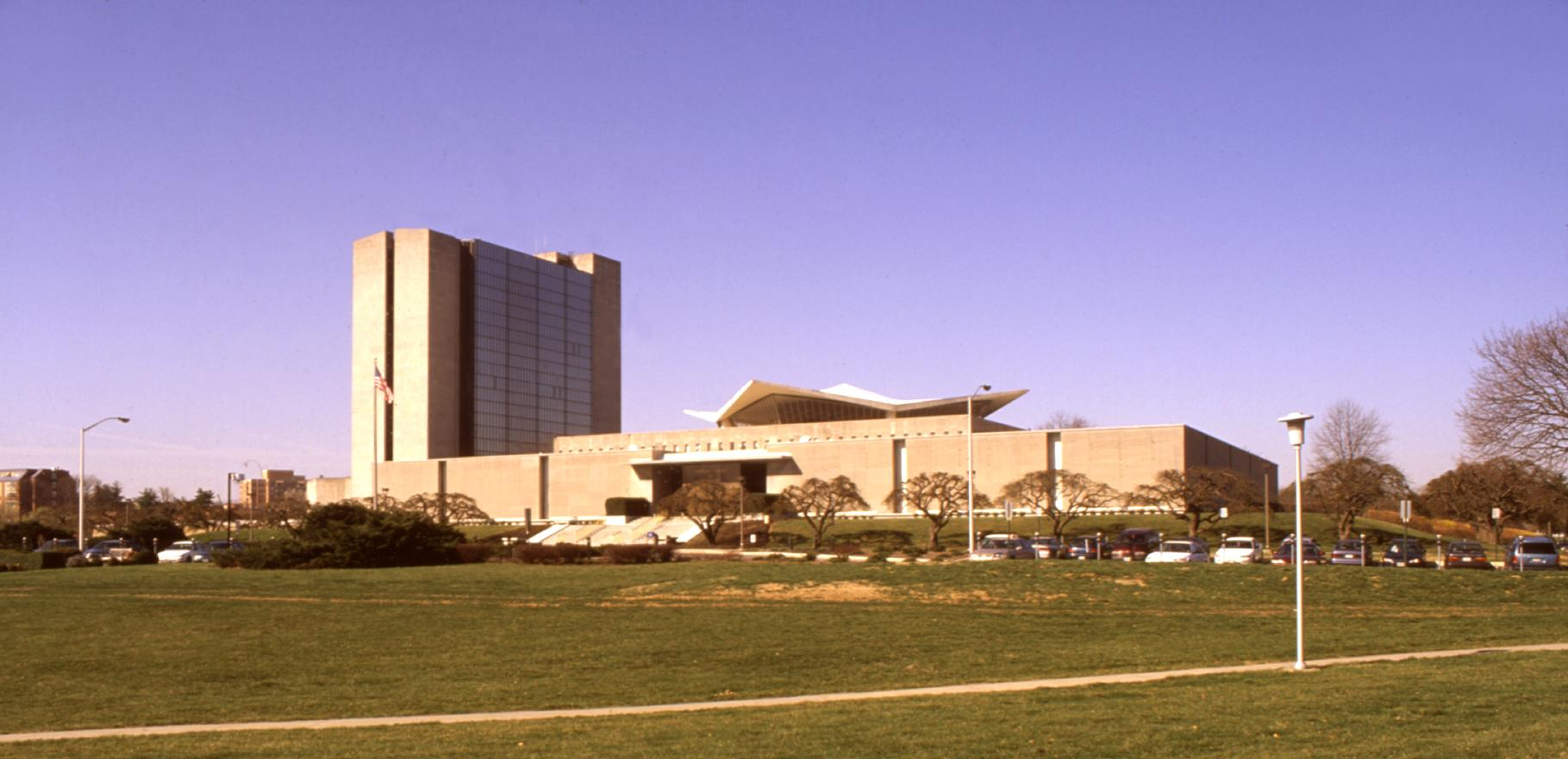
- The library in 1999
- 38°59′45″N 77°05′56″W
- Location: Bethesda, Maryland, United States
- Type: Medical library
- Established: 1836; 190 years ago (as the Library of the Office of the Surgeon General of the Army)
- Reference to legal mandate: Public Law 941 – August 3, 1956, an amendment to Title III of the Public Health Service Act
- Branch of: National Institutes of Health
- Branches: Five

Collection
- Items collected: books, journals, manuscripts, images, and multimedia; genomic, chemical, toxicological, and environmental data; drug information; clinical trials data; health data standards; software; and consumer health information
- Size: 7 million physical items; 45 million digital citations; one billion genetic sequences (2023)
- Criteria for collection: Acquiring, organizing, and preserving the world's scholarly biomedical literature

Access and use
- Access requirements: Open to the public
- Circulation: Billions of electronic searches annually
- Population served: Hundreds of millions of online users (2026)

Other information
- Budget: US $497,548,000 (2024)
- Director: Stephen Sherry (Acting)
- Employees: 741 (2024)
- Website: nlm.nih.gov

The United States National Library of Medicine (NLM), operated by the United States federal government, is the world's largest medical library.

Located in Bethesda, Maryland, the NLM is an institute within the National Institutes of Health. Its collections include more than seven million books, journals, technical reports, manuscripts, microfilms, photographs, and images on medicine and related sciences, including some of the world's oldest and rarest works.

As of December 2025, the acting director of the NLM was Stephen Sherry.

== History ==
The precursor of the National Library of Medicine, established in 1836, was the Library of the Surgeon General's Office, a part of the office of the Surgeon General of the United States Army. The Armed Forces Institute of Pathology and its Medical Museum were founded in 1862 as the Army Medical Museum. Throughout their history, the Library of the Surgeon General's Office and the Army Medical Museum often shared quarters. From 1866 to 1887, they were housed in Ford's Theatre after production there was stopped following the assassination of President Abraham Lincoln.

In 1956, the library collection was transferred from the control of the U.S. Department of Defense to the Public Health Service of the Department of Health, Education, and Welfare, and renamed the National Library of Medicine through an act of Congress and President John F. Kennedy. The library moved to its current quarters in Bethesda, Maryland on the campus of the National Institutes of Health, in 1962.

Designed to protect the NLM collection from adversarial threats, the building is constructed with limestone and has 50 mi (80 km) of bookshelves underground. The Lister Hill National Center for Biomedical Communications began in 1968, MEDLINE in the 1970s, the National Center for Biotechnology Information in 1988, MedlinePlus in 1998, with ClinicalTrials.gov and PubMed Central launching in 2000. NLM has partnerships with national libraries in some 20 countries, and outreach to consumers and health professionals worldwide. In 2023, MedlinePlus pages were accessed 850 million times serving 440 million users. The 2024 budget for NLM was $498 million.

== Directors ==
Directors from 1945 to present

No.	Portrait	Director	Took office	Left office	Refs.
1		Leon Lloyd Gardner	1945	1946	
2		Joseph Hamilton McNinch	1946	1949	
3		Frank Bradway Rogers	1949	August 31, 1963	
4		Martin Marc Cummings	January 1, 1964	September 30, 1984	
5		Donald A. B. Lindberg	October 11, 1984	March 31, 2015	
acting		Betsy Humphreys	April 1, 2015	September 11, 2016	
6		Patricia Flatley Brennan	September 12, 2016	September 30, 2023	
acting		Stephen Sherry	October 1, 2023	Present	

== Publications and informational resources ==
Since 1879, the National Library of Medicine has published the Index Medicus, a monthly guide to articles, in nearly five thousand selected journals. The last issue of Index Medicus was printed in December 2004, but this information is offered in the freely accessible PubMed, among the more than fifteen million MEDLINE journal article references and abstracts going back to the 1960s and 1.5 million references going back to the 1950s.

In 1986 Director Lindberg's Grateful Med project, named after the Grateful Dead band, facilitated direct access to the NLM MEDLINE database by making it significantly more affordable for all health professionals.

The National Library of Medicine runs the National Center for Biotechnology Information, which houses biological databases (PubMed among them) that are freely accessible on the Internet through the Entrez search engine and Lister Hill National Center For Biomedical Communications. As the United States National Release Center for SNOMED CT, NLM provides SNOMED CT data and resources to licensees of the NLM UMLS Metathesaurus. NLM maintains the ClinicalTrials.gov registry for human interventional and observational studies. Additionally NLM runs ChemIDplus, which is a chemical database of over 400,000 chemicals complete with names, synonyms, and structures. It includes links to NLM and other databases and resources, including links to federal, state and international agencies.

== Toxicology and environmental health ==
The Toxicology and Environmental Health Program was established at the National Library of Medicine in 1967 and is charged with developing computer databases compiled from the medical literature and from the files of governmental and nongovernmental organizations. The program has implemented several information systems for chemical emergency response and public education, such as the Toxicology Data Network, TOXMAP, Tox Town, Wireless Information System for Emergency Responders, Toxmystery, and the Household Products Database. These resources are accessible without charge on the internet.

== Radiation exposure ==
The United States National Library of Medicine Radiation Emergency Management System provides:

- Guidance for health care providers, primarily physicians, about clinical diagnosis and treatment of radiation injury during radiological and nuclear emergencies
- Just-in-time, evidence-based, usable information with sufficient background and context to make complex issues understandable to those without formal radiation medicine expertise
- Web-based information that may be downloaded in advance, so that it would be available during an emergency if the Internet were not accessible

Radiation Emergency Management System is produced by the United States Department of Health and Human Services, Office of the Assistant Secretary for Preparedness and Response, Office of Planning and Emergency Operations, in cooperation with the National Library of Medicine, Division of Specialized Information Services, with subject matter experts from the National Cancer Institute, the Centers for Disease Control and Prevention, and many U.S. and international consultants.

== Extramural division ==
The Extramural Division provides grants to support research in medical information science and to support planning and development of computer and communications systems in medical institutions. Research, publications, and exhibitions on the history of medicine and the life sciences also are supported by the History of Medicine Division.

== National Center for Biotechnology Information ==
The National Center for Biotechnology Information is an intramural division within National Library of Medicine that creates public databases in molecular biology, conducts research in computational biology, develops software tools for analyzing molecular and genomic data, and disseminates biomedical information, all to improve understanding of processes affecting human health and disease.

== See also ==
- JournalReview.org
- National Library of Medicine classification system
- PubMed
