= International Health Terminology Standards Development Organisation =

SNOMED International
- Formation: 2007
- Type: Nonprofit
- Headquarters: London, UK
- Products: SNOMED CT
- Members: 54 member countries/territories (2026)
- CEO: Don Sweete
- COO: Shelly Lipton
- Website: http://www.snomed.org/
- Formerly called: International Health Terminology Standards Development Organisation (IHTSDO)

The International Health Terminology Standards Development Organisation (IHTSDO), trading as SNOMED International, is private company limited by guarantee and established under the laws of England that owns SNOMED CT, a leading clinical terminology used in electronic health records. IHTSDO was founded in 2007 by 9 charter member countries (Australia, Canada, Denmark, Lithuania, Sweden, the Netherlands, New Zealand, the United Kingdom and the United States) in order to acquire the rights of SNOMED CT from the College of American Pathologists (CAP) and make the development of a global clinical language for healthcare an international, collaborative effort.

== Governance ==
IHTSDO governance is defined in the IHTSDO Articles of Association. The organization is headquartered in the United Kingdom (London).

Since 2007 the number of member countries has increased from 9 to 29. The members were (as of December 2016): Australia, Belgium, Brunei, Canada, Chile, Czech Republic, Denmark, Estonia, Hong Kong, Iceland, India, Ireland, Israel, Lithuania, Malaysia, Malta, Netherlands, New Zealand, Poland, Portugal, Singapore, Slovakia, Slovenia, Spain, Sweden, Switzerland, the United Kingdom, the United States and Uruguay. The member countries provide the bulk of the institutional financing through payment of yearly member fees, which are based on gross national income. Members of IHTSDO can be either an agency of a national government or another body (such as a corporation or regional government agency) which has been endorsed by an appropriate national government authority within the country it represents. Member countries commit themselves to the dissemination of the IHTSDO terminologies within their jurisdiction, including where appropriate the creation of local translations, extensions, and mappings.

The general assembly (GA) is the organization's highest authority and is composed of representatives from all member countries with equal representation (although some member countries have not selected GA representatives and therefore are not represented in the GA). The GA is collectively charged with assuring that the purpose, objects and principles of the association are pursued and that the interests of IHTSDO are safeguarded. The GA appoints the management board (MB), which has overall responsibility for the management and direction of IHTSDO and has a duty to act in the best interests of the organization. The member countries are also represented by the member forum, which provides input on member priorities and helps develop the IHTSDO plan of work.

The organization is structured into four major areas: customer relations, operations, products & services, and strategy.

Seven advisory groups provide advice to the management team. In addition there are topic-specific project groups (PGs) and special interest groups (SIGs) which supplement and report to the standing committees. These groups are open and are not elected. IHTSDO PGs and SIGs include:

IHTSDO special interest groups (SIGs)	IHTSDO project groups
Anesthesia	Anatomy Model
Concept Model	Collaborative Editing Roadmap
Education	Content Product Development Planning
IHTSDO Workbench Developers	Event, Condition and Episode Model
Implementation	Family/General Practice Refset and ICPC Mapping
International Pathology & Laboratory Medicine	IHTSDO Translation Tooling
Mapping	Machine & Human Readable Concept Model
Nursing	Mapping SNOMED CT to ICD-10
Pharmacy	Migration
Translation	Observable and Investigation Model
	Organism & Infectious Disease Model
	Request Submission
	Substance Hierarchy Redesign
	Translation Quality Assessment

IHTSDO's work is documented on its website. The internal communication is supported by a Collaborative content management system.

== Strategic directions ==
The broad vision for IHTSDO is set out in their Articles of Association. A new five-year plan was formulated in 2015.

IHTSDO aims to achieve interoperability and harmonization between its terminology products and those standards produced by other international standards development organisations (SDOs). In support of this IHTSDO has negotiated a number of collaboration agreements with other SDOs, such as the World Health Organization, HL7, International Council of Nurses, IEEE, Regenstrief Institute & NPU, openEHR, and WONCA.

== Meetings ==
IHTSDO organizes periodic conferences. Generally within these conferences time is allocated to meetings of advisory groups, project groups and SIGs, to enable them to meet face to face. In addition there are meetings of the Member Forum and the Affiliate Forum. Advisory Groups, PGs and SIGs also communicate throughout the year via conference calls and manage messages and documents in a content management system (CMS).

== Awards ==
SNOMED International's Award of Excellence is awarded annually.

Prior winners
Year	Country	Recipient
2009	USA	James Campbell
2010	UK	Gwen Smith
2011	UK	Ian Green
2012	Australia	Dion McMurtrie
2013	Sweden	Kristina Brand Persson
2014	USA	Judith Warren
2015	USA	Jim Case
2016	Sweden	Daniel Karlsson
2017	USA	Bruce Goldberg
2018	Australia	Michael Lawley
2019	USA	Mark Jurkovich
2022	Chile / China	Alejandro Mauro / Vicky Fung
2023	USA / Netherlands	Scott W. Campbell / Pim Volkert
2024	Republic of Korea	Hyeoun-Ae Park

SNOMED International’s Lifetime Achievement Award is awarded annually.

Prior winners
Year	Country	Recipient
2010	Canada	Roger Coté
2012	UK	Martin Severs
2014	UK	Anne Casey
2015	USA	Kent Spackman
2016	Argentina	Guillermo Reynoso
2017	USA	Betsy Humphreys
2018	USA	Andrew Wiesenthal
2019	Netherlands / New Zealand	Lies Van Gennip / Stewart Jessamine
2022	UK	David Markwell / Jeremy Thorp
2023	USA	Keith E. Campbell / Vivian Auld
2024	Malaysia	Md Khadzir Sheikh Ahmad

== Documentation ==
To support the implementation of SNOMED CT, a number of publications are produced by IHTSDO. These range from user guides to technical implementation guides as well as some educational materials and videos. Documents are available through the public website, but some items such as the videos can be found via YouTube. Member countries also contribute to the public domain and documents, which can often be found on individual member country websites; a link to these is provided on the IHTSDO webpages.

== Office ==
The IHTSDO head office is located at 1 Kingdom Street, London, UK W6 6BD.
