= European Federation of Organisations for Medical Physics =

- Abbreviation: EFOMP
- Formation: May 1980
- Founded at: London
- Purpose: Umbrella Organisation for European National Societies in Medical Physics
- Headquarters: Netherlands, Utrecht
- Region served: Europe
- Members: 37 member organisations 38 company members 900 individual associate members (January 2024)
- Official language: English
- President: Efi Koutsouveli
- Vice President: Paddy Gilligan
- Secretary General: Brenda Byrne
- Treasurer: Jaroslav Ptacek
- Website: www.efomp.org

The European Federation of Organisations for Medical Physics (EFOMP) was founded in May 1980 in London to serve as an umbrella organisation representing the national Medical Physics societies in Europe. The office moved to Utrecht in January 2021. It is a non-profit organisation and aims to foster and coordinate the activities of its national member organisations, encourage exchange and dissemination of professional and scientific information, develop guidelines for education, training and accreditation programmes and to make recommendations on the responsibilities, organisational relationships and roles of medical physicists.

== Structure ==
The federation consists of national member organisations (NMOs) representing medical physics in Europe, where only one NMO can represent the corresponding nation The number of representatives each NMO can send into the council depends on the number of national members. The council is the governing authority of EFOMP and normally meets once a year. The council elects the president and all other members of the executive and governing committees, it is responsible for maintaining the constitution of the federation, it handles all NMO related issues and sets up committees, foundations and other legal and operative bodies to facilitate the aims and purpose of the federation. The officers of the council are the members of the governing committee and the chairpersons of the committees. The federation has six permanent committees:

- Communications and Publications: is in charge of demonstrating the application of physical sciences to medicine to the public. The committee is responsible for the dissemination of information on EFOMP activities to enhance the education, competence, research and continuing professional development of medical physicists across Europe via digital channels of communications and publications (journal, newsletter Website, social media).
- European and International Matters: represents the interest of the federation to the various bodies of the European Union and beyond and promotes international links among National Member Organizations and other professional bodies.
- Education and Training: is responsible for supporting NMOs in providing educational approaches for physics in medicine
- Professional Matters: is in charge of establishing and maintaining the recognition of the Medical Physicists as an academic profession in Europe bridging between physics and medicine and deals with professional issues related to the medical physics profession
- Projects: is in charge of participation in and coordination of major European projects in close collaboration with national and international legal bodies
- Science: is responsible for supporting the NMOs in setting up scientific activities and organizing ordinary meetings, promotes the operation of working groups on special topics and participates in the production of guidelines and policies describing good practice

== National Member Organisations ==
EFOMP is the umbrella organisation for 37 nations, each of which are constituted by one medical physics organisation and each representing together more than 9000 medical physicists and clinical engineers working in the field of medical physics. Each national society has a certain number of delegates in the council, depending on the number of national members: up to 100 memberships result in one delegate, up to 400 entitles to two delegates and a society with 401 or more memberships can have three delegates. Each country can only be represented by one NMO. When multiple societies exist, these can be Associate Members.The Russian NMO terminated its membership in August 2022.

Member state	Current national member organisation	Founded	EFOMP affiliation	Number of delegates	Approved national registration scheme
Albania	Albanian Association of Medical Physics (AAMP)		2019	1	
Austria	Austrian Society of Medical Physics (ÖGMP)	1980	1980	2	Yes
Belgium	Société Bèlge des Physiciens des Hospitaux; Belgische Vereniging Ziekenhuis Fysici (SBPH-BVZF)		1980	2	
Bosnia and Herzegovina	Association of Medical Physicists in Bosnia and Herzegovina (AMPBH)		(1980) 2017	1	
Bulgaria	Bulgarian Society of Biomedical Physics and Engineering (BSBPE)	1971	1983	1	
Croatia	Croatian Medical Physics Association (CROMPA)	1984	(1980)	1	
Cyprus	Cyprus Association of Medical Physics and Bio-Medical Engineering (CAMPBE)	1988		1	Yes
Czechia	Czech Association of Medical Physicists (CAMP)	2004	(1986) 2004	2	
Denmark	Danish Society for Medical Physics (DSMP)	1981	1980	2	
Estonia	Estonian Society for Biomedical Engineering and Medical Physics (ESBEMP)			1	
Finland	Finnish Association of Hospital Physicists (FAHP)	1965	1980	2	Yes
France	Société Française de Physique Médicale (SFPM)	1972	1980	3	Yes
Germany	Deutsche Gesellschaft für Medizinische Physik (DGMP)	1969	1980	3	Yes
Greece	Hellenic Association of Medical Physicists (HAMP)	1969	1981	2	Yes
Hungary	Hungarian Society of Medical Physics (HSMP)	1974	1987	1	Yes
Ireland	Irish Association of Physicists in Medicine (IAPM)	2010	1985	2	
Italy	Associazione Italiana di Fisica Medica (AIFM)	1998	1980	3	Yes
Iceland	Icelandic Society of Medical Physicists (ISMP)	2022	2023	1	
Latvia	Latvian Medical Engineering and Physics Society (LMEPS)		2016	1	
Lithuania	Lithuanian Medical Physics Society (LMPS)	2009	2012	1	
Luxembourg	Association Luxembourgeoise de Physique Médicale (ALPhyM)	2015	2023	1	
Malta	Malta Association of Medical Physicists (MAMP)	2007	2010	1	
Moldova	Association of Medical Physicists from the Republic of Moldova (AFMMoldova)	2016	2016	1	
Netherlands	Nederlandse vereniging voor klinische fysica (NVKF)	1973	1980	3	Yes
North Macedonia	Association of Medical Physics and Biomedical Engineering (AMPBE)		(1980) 2004	1	
Norway	Norwegian Association of Medical Physics (NFMF)	1976	1980	2	
Poland	Polish Society of Medical Physics (PSMP)	1965	1987	2	Yes
Portugal	Medical Physics Division of the Portuguese Physics Society (PPS)		1985	2	
Romania	Romanian College of Medical Physicists (CFMR)	1990 (renewed 2010)	2015	2	
Russia	Association of Medical Physicists of Russia (AMPR)	1993	2010	1	
Serbia	Serbian Association of Medical Physicists (DMFS)	2012	(1980) 2012	1	
Slovakia	Slovak Society of Physics and Biophysics Slovak Medical Society (SKBS)		(1986) 2011	1	
Slovenia	Slovenian Biophysical Society (SBS)		(1980) 2013	1	
Spain	Sociedad Espanola de Fisica Medica (SEFM)	1974	1980	3	
Sweden	Swedish Hospital Physicists Association (SHPA)	1976	1980	2	
Switzerland	Schweizerische Gesellschaft für Strahlenbiologie und Medizinische Physik; Société Suisse de Radiobiologie et de Physique Médicale; Società Svizzera di Radiobiologia e di Fisica Medica (SGSMP-SSRPM-SSRFM)	1964	1980	2	
United Kingdom	Institute of Physics and Engineering in Medicine (IPEM)	1943	1980	3	

== Associate Member Organisations ==
| Lithuania || Lithuanian Association of Medical Physics and Biomedical Engineering (LMFBIA)|| 2009 || 2012 ||

The foundation date specifies the constitution of the earliest national organisation (separate society or division of superordinate organisation) of natural scientists or engineers working in a clinical environment which can be considered the predecessor of the NMO. The affiliation dates represent the earliest memberships of the current member nations (or its predecessor, e.g. Yugoslavia, Czechoslovakia) represented by a society.

== European and international matters/projects ==
Several projects at European level with impact on medical physics matters and legislation have been undertaken. EFOMP is either in the advisory panel of multiple European projects or takes part in projects as a consortium member and endorses different projects that have an impact on and connection to medical physics profession, research, education as well as to the field of radiation protection.

One of the most important was the transposition of the Basic Safety Standards (BSS) Directive (Council Directive 2013/59/Euratom). After the BSS was brought into force in 2014, EFOMP headed a European consortium with the task to merge current scientific, technological and operational knowledge and experience with the consolidation of different directives and recommendations in the field of radiation protection. The objective of this project was to evaluate Member States‘ activities for the transposition and implementation of Council Directive in the medical area. In addition an exchange of initial experiences and resolutions was coordinated in order to identify good practices. In 2021, EFOMP has been involved in projects aimed to study the implementation of the Council Directive 2013/59/Euratom requirements for Medical Equipment with Respect to Monitoring and Control of Patient's Radiation Exposures, the analysis of workforce availability, education, and training needs to ensure quality and safety aspects of medical applications involving ionising radiation in the EU, the implementation of the Euratom and the EU legal bases with respect to the therapeutic uses of radiopharmaceuticals. All these studies are part of the European Union SAMIRA Strategic Agenda for Medical Ionising Radiation Applications and is the energy sector's contribution to Europe's Beating Cancer Plan.

MEDIRAD, has been one of the projects EFOMP was involved in during its preparation phase started by the European Union in 2017 dealing with implications of medical low dose radiation exposure and participated in work package six in order to formulate policy recommendations for the effective protection of patients and medical workers and the general public.

EFOMP has been a stakeholder in the ENEN project with an interest to build European Nuclear Competence through continuous Advanced and Structured Education and Training Actions.

Guidelines for manufacturers have been developed in 2019 jointly with the Coordination Committee of the Radiological, Electromedical and Healthcare IT Industry (COCIR), EFOMP and the European Society for Radiotherapy and Oncology (ESTRO) to meet the requirements of article 78.2 of the Basic Safety Standards (BSS) Directive (96/29/Euratom). The guidelines, developed also with the cooperation of the Heads of European Radiological Protection Competent Authorities (HERCA), provide guidance to manufacturers on how to compile information on radiological risk in an easy-to-use document, that is addressed to undertakings to help them carry out risk evaluation of radiotherapy departments, as required by article 63 and 78.2 of the BSS Directive.

== Education and training ==
The EFOMP School for Medical Physics Experts (ESMPE) organizes medical physics education and training events specifically targeted to Medical Physicists who are already Medical Physics Experts (MPEs) or would like to achieve Medical Physics Expert status. Several editions were organised jointly with COCIR driven by the need for a closer cooperation between manufacturers and medical physicists to increase the awareness of features of medical devices related to imaging, radiotherapy and nuclear medicine. In 2019, EFOMP launched an e-learning platform, where pdfs and video recordings of the lectures given during the EFOMP school editions have been made available.

The main target of EFOMP is the harmonization of Medical Physics education and training standards throughout Europe. For this purpose, two elements have been implemented:

- NMOs education and training scheme for medical physicists can be validated by the Professional Matters Committee and approved by the EFOMP Board of Officers. The long-term aim of the National Registration Scheme (NRS) is a generally accepted level of expertise, facilitating an exchange of professionals over Europe.
- The European Examination board (EEB) awards the European Diploma of Medical Physics (EDMP) and the European Attestation Certificate to those Medical Physicists that have reached the Medical Physics Expert (EACMPE) level.

== Science ==
Included in the scope of the federation is to coordinate scientific activities and to support the development of guidelines and directives. A number of Working groups are operating for a specific time period to create quality control protocols, guidance documents, harmonise practices update core curricula.

Every two years, EFOMP organizes the European Congress of Medical Physics (ECMP). The first congress took place in Athens (2016), the second one in Copenhagen (2018), the 3rd online due to COVID19 pandemic, the 4th in Dublin (2022), the forth will take place in Munich and the fifth in Valecia (2026).

Since 2007, Physica Medica the European Journal of Medical Physics (EJMP), is the official scientific journal of the organisation. The owner of the journal is the Italian Association of Medical Physics (AIFM) and it is also the official organ of the French (SFPM), Irish (IAPM), Czech Republic (CAMP) and Hellenic (HAMP) Societies of Medical Physics. In 2019, EJMP has become official publication of the International Organization for Medical Physics (IOMP). Every month a volume is published. According to the Institute for Scientific Information (ISI) the current Impact Factor is 2.532 (2018).

There are three other scientific journals that EFOMP is associated with:

- Physiological Measurements owned by the Institute of Physics and Engineering in Medicine (IPEM)
- European Radiology owned by the European Society of Radiology (ESR)
- Physics in Medicine and Biology owned by IPEM

EFOMP publishes a quarterly electronic newsletter called the European Medical Physics News (EMPnews).

== Co-operation ==
EFOMP created an international network of relationships with other stakeholders in the field of physical science applied to healthcare.

Collaborations:

- regional organisation member of the International Organization for Medical Physics (IOMP)
- collaborator with the International Atomic Energy Agency (IAEA) in the field of Radiation Protection for Patients
- shareholder of the European Institute for Biomedical Imaging Research (EIBIR)
- representative for medical physics in the organization Heads of European Radiological Protection Competent Authorities (HERCA)
- associate member of the European Foundation for Training and Education in Radiation Protection (EUTERP)
- liaison organisation of the International Commission on Radiological Protection (ICRP)
- member of the Digital Imaging and Communications in Medicine (DICOM)
- participant in the European Commission Initiative on Breast Cancer (ECIBC)

Memoranda of understanding:

- American Association of Physicists in Medicine (AAPM)
- European Association of Nuclear Medicine (EANM)
- European Coordination Committee of the Radiological, Electromedical and Healthcare IT Industry (COCIR)
- Asia-Oceania Federation of Organizations for Medical Physics (AFOMP)
- European Society for Magnetic Resonance in Medicine and Biology (ESMRMB)
- European Society for Radiotherapy and Oncology (ESTRO)
- European Society of Radiology (ESR)
- European Radiation Dosimetry Group (EURADOS)
- European Organisation for Research and Treatment of Cancer (EORTC)
- Nuclear Medicine Europe (NMEU)
- The Australasian College of Physical Scientists & Engineers in Medicine (ACPSEM)
- Middle East Federation Of Organizations of Medical Physics (MEFOMP)
