= Adrian Dixon =

Radiologist and Master of Peterhouse, Cambridge

Professor Adrian Dixon FRCR FRCP FRCS FMedSci
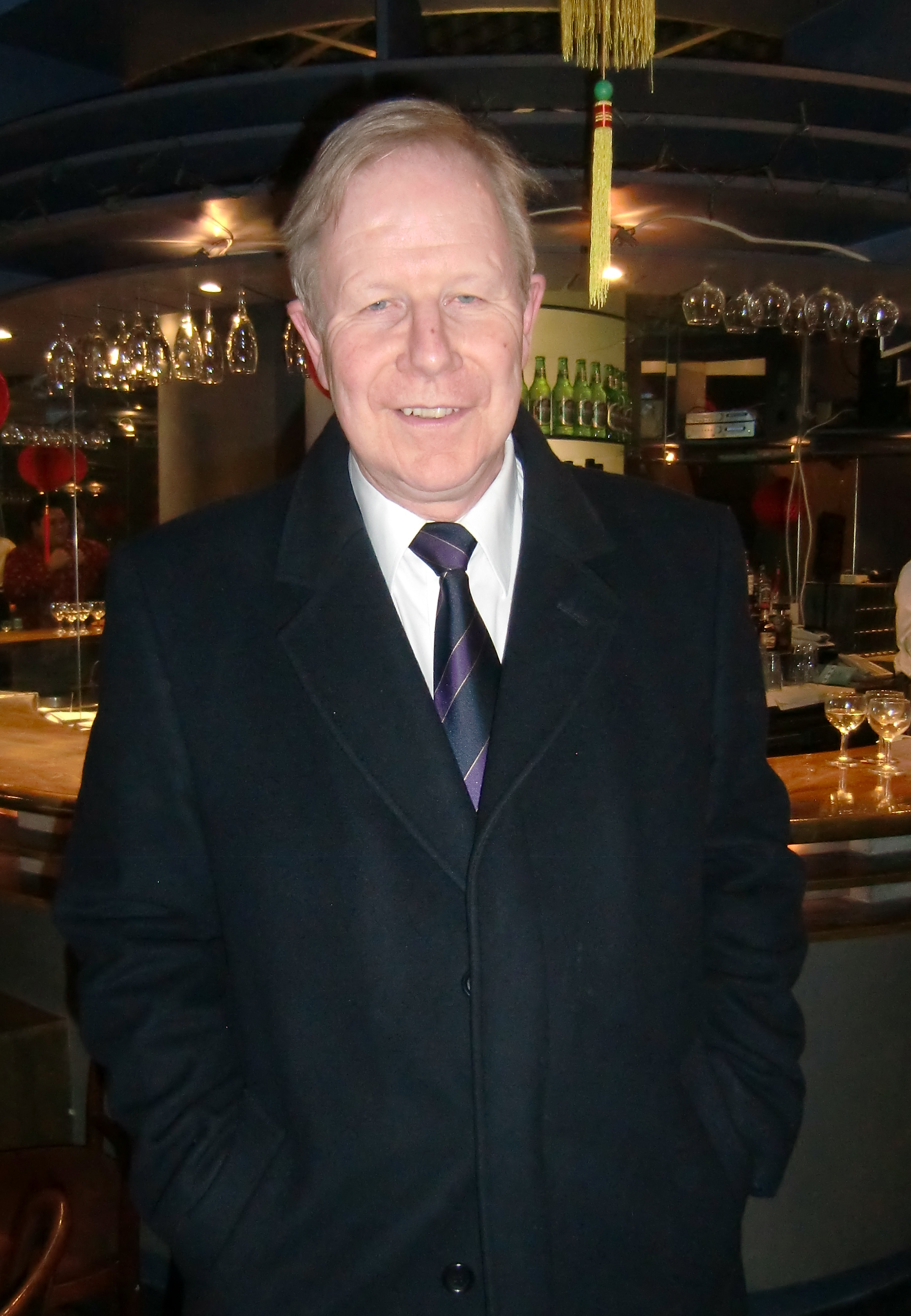
- Born: 5 February 1948 (age 78); Cambridge, UK
- Education: Cambridge University, King's College, Cambridge, Uppingham
- Medical career
- Profession: Academic, Former Master of Peterhouse, Cambridge
- Institutions: Cambridge University, Great Ormond Street Hospital and St Bartholomew's Hospital
- Sub-specialties: Radiology
- Research: Radiology

Adrian Kendal Dixon (born 1948) was the Master of Peterhouse, Cambridge until 30 June 2016. He is now closely involved in the University of Cambridge administration, both at home and abroad.

Dixon was educated at Uppingham and the University of Cambridge. In 2014 he was awarded the gold medal of the European Society of Radiology.

== Early life ==
Dixon was born in Cambridge, where he is now Emeritus Professor of Radiology at the University of Cambridge and Honorary Consultant Radiologist at Addenbrooke's Hospital. The son of a long-standing Fellow of King's College, Cambridge, Kendal Dixon, and the grandson of Henry Horatio Dixon, he was educated at Uppingham and King's College, Cambridge, where he studied medicine, graduating in 1969 before undertaking clinical medical studies at St Bartholomew's Hospital, London.

== Career and Academia ==
Dixon pursued medicine in Nottingham, obtaining his MRCP in 1974 (proceeding FRCP 1991), before specialising in radiology. After periods in paediatric radiology at Great Ormond Street Hospital and in computed tomography (CT) at St Bartholomew's Hospital, he became a lecturer at the University of Cambridge's Department of Radiology in 1979. He was elected as a Fellow of Peterhouse in 1986. In 1994 he became a professor of radiology at the university, and remains Emeritus Professor and an Honorary Consultant Radiologist. He was appointed editor-in-chief of European Radiology in 2007, completing a 6-year term in 2013.

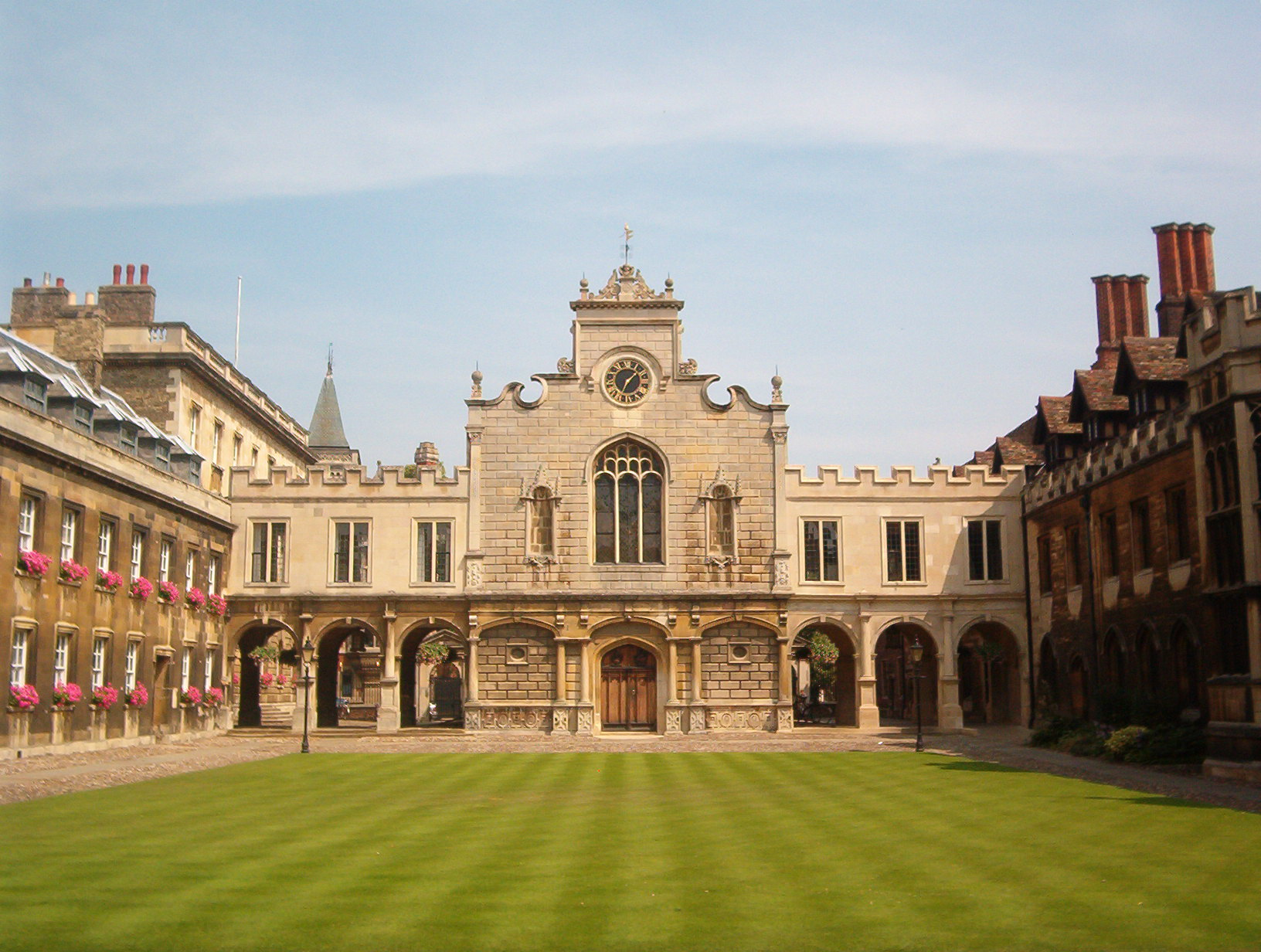
University of Cambridge (Peterhouse)

== Master of Peterhouse, Cambridge ==
He was elected Master of Peterhouse, Cambridge from 2008, stepping down from the position on 30 June 2016. He remains active within the University of Cambridge administration and is still closely involved with Peterhouse. Dixon is a Fellow of the Royal College of Radiologists (FRCR), the Royal College of Physicians (FRCP), the Royal College of Surgeons (FRCS) and the Academy of Medical Sciences (FMedSci). In 2014 he was awarded the gold medal of the European Society of Radiology.

Academic offices
Preceded by The Lord Wilson of Tillyorn	Master of Peterhouse, Cambridge; 2008 – 2016	Succeeded by Bridget Kendall
