= International Day of Radiology =

International observance, 8 November

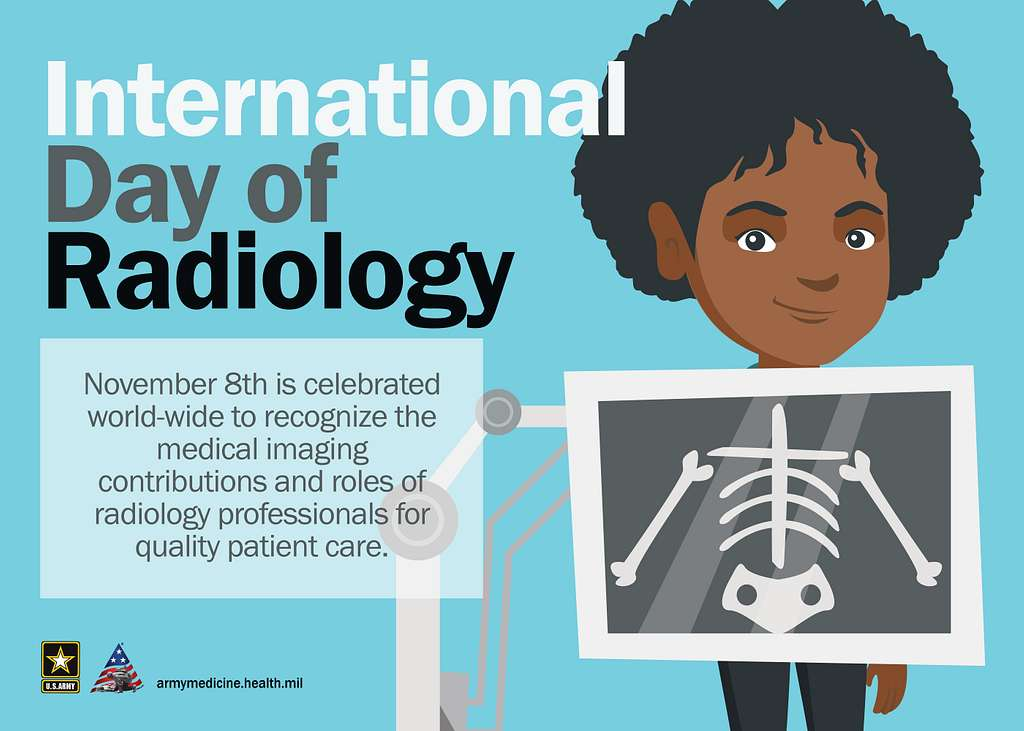
- Status: active
- Genre: international day
- Date: November 8
- Frequency: Annually
- Years active: 8, since 2012
- Sponsor: European Society of Radiology
- Website: internationaldayofradiology.com

The International Day of Radiology (IDoR) is an annual event promoting the role of medical imaging in modern healthcare. It is celebrated on November 8 each year and coincides with the anniversary of the discovery of x-rays. It was first introduced in 2012, as a joint initiative of the European Society of Radiology (ESR), the Radiological Society of North America (RSNA), and the American College of Radiology (ACR). The International Day of Radiology is acknowledged and celebrated by nearly 200 national, sub-speciality, and related societies around the world. 'Radiographers Association of Madhya Pradesh(India)''' has celebrated this day since 1996 and the theme for this day was raised by '''Mr.Shivakant Vajpai''', Secretary of Madhya Pradesh Radiographers Association, also holding a designation of Radiation Safety Officer and Senior Radiographer in government of Madhya Pradesh, India.

== Background ==
The International Day of Radiology is a successor to the European Day of Radiology which was launched in 2011. The first and only European Day of Radiology (EDoR) was held on February 10, 2011, to commemorate the anniversary of Röntgen's death and was organised by the European Society of Radiology(ESR). Due to the success of the EDoR, the ESR entered into cooperation with the RSNA and the ACR to establish the International Day of Radiology. It was also decided that the date of the celebration should be moved from the anniversary of Röntgen's death to that of his discovery of the x-ray. The day was officially confirmed by the three founding societies during the annual RSNA meeting in Chicago on November 28, 2011.

On November 8, 1895 Wilhelm Conrad Röntgen discovered x-rays by chance while investigating cathode rays, effectively laying the foundation for the medical discipline of radiology. This discovery would grow to include various methods of imaging and establish itself as a crucial element of modern medicine. November 8 was eventually chosen as the appropriate day to mark the celebrations which are observed by radiological societies the world over.

== Yearly Theme ==
In addition to the general recognition of radiology, a theme is chosen every year, focusing on various specialities and sub-specialities of radiology. These themes have included:

- 2025: Empowering Healthcare through Imaging Excellence
- 2024: Radiologists and Radiographers Supporting Patients
- 2023: Celebrating Patient Safety
- 2022: Radiographers at the Forefront of Patient Safety
- 2021: Interventional radiology -Active care for the patient
- 2020: Radiologists and Radiographers supporting patients during COVID-19
- 2019: Sports Imaging
- 2018: Cardiac Imaging
- 2017: Emergency Imaging
- 2016: Breast Imaging
- 2015: Paediatric Imaging
- 2014: Brain Imaging
- 2013: Thoracic Imaging
- 2012: Oncologic Imaging

== Associated Events ==
In and around November 8 of every year, international radiological societies all over the world celebrate the day with their own organised events. These celebrations come in the form of exhibitions, workshops, lectures, and social media campaigns which invite radiologists as well as the general public to participate and learn more about radiology.

In 2018, various radiological and partner societies organised events to draw attention to radiology and that year's theme of cardiac imaging. Examples include:

- The Canadian Association of Radiologists hosted an event that encouraged radiologists from across Canada to meet with Members of Parliament on Parliament Hill to discuss key issues in medical imaging, relevant to patient care.
- The Japan Radiological Society held a series of public lectures on cardiac imaging in Kumamoto, moderated by professors from Kumamoto University.
- The Sociedad Española de Radiología Medica (SERAM) celebrated in Madrid by inviting cardiac imaging experts to be featured at talks on the history and future of the sub-speciality.

== Publications ==
In further support of the day, the European Society of Radiology publishes a book every year on the selected theme. In 2018, the book, The HEART revealed, was published as a free pdf download on the IDoR website. The book, authored by professional radiologists, contains descriptions of various cardiac diseases where imaging is helpful in diagnosis, treatment, and follow-up.

Other published texts addressing the yearly theme include:

- 2017 HELP, Emergency Medical Imaging
- 2016 Screening & Beyond, Medical imaging in the detection, diagnosis and management of breast diseases
- 2015 The Gentle Way, The Art of Paediatric Imaging
- 2014 Brainwatch, Detecting and diagnosing brain diseases with medical imaging
- 2013 Breathe Easy, How radiology helps to find and fight lung diseases

In addition to the themed publications, the European Society of Radiology in collaboration with the International Society for the History of Radiology published a three-volume series on the history of radiology, The Story of Radiology.

== See also ==
- Radiology
- X-ray
- Wilhelm Conrad Röntgen
- World Radiography Day

== Supporting Societies ==
- The Asian Oceanian Society of Radiology
- The Interamerican College of Radiology
- European Federation of Radiographer Societies
- Eurosafe Imaging
- International Society of Radiology
- The Royal Australian and New Zealand College of Radiologists
