= Wilhelm Röntgen =

German physicist (1845–1923)

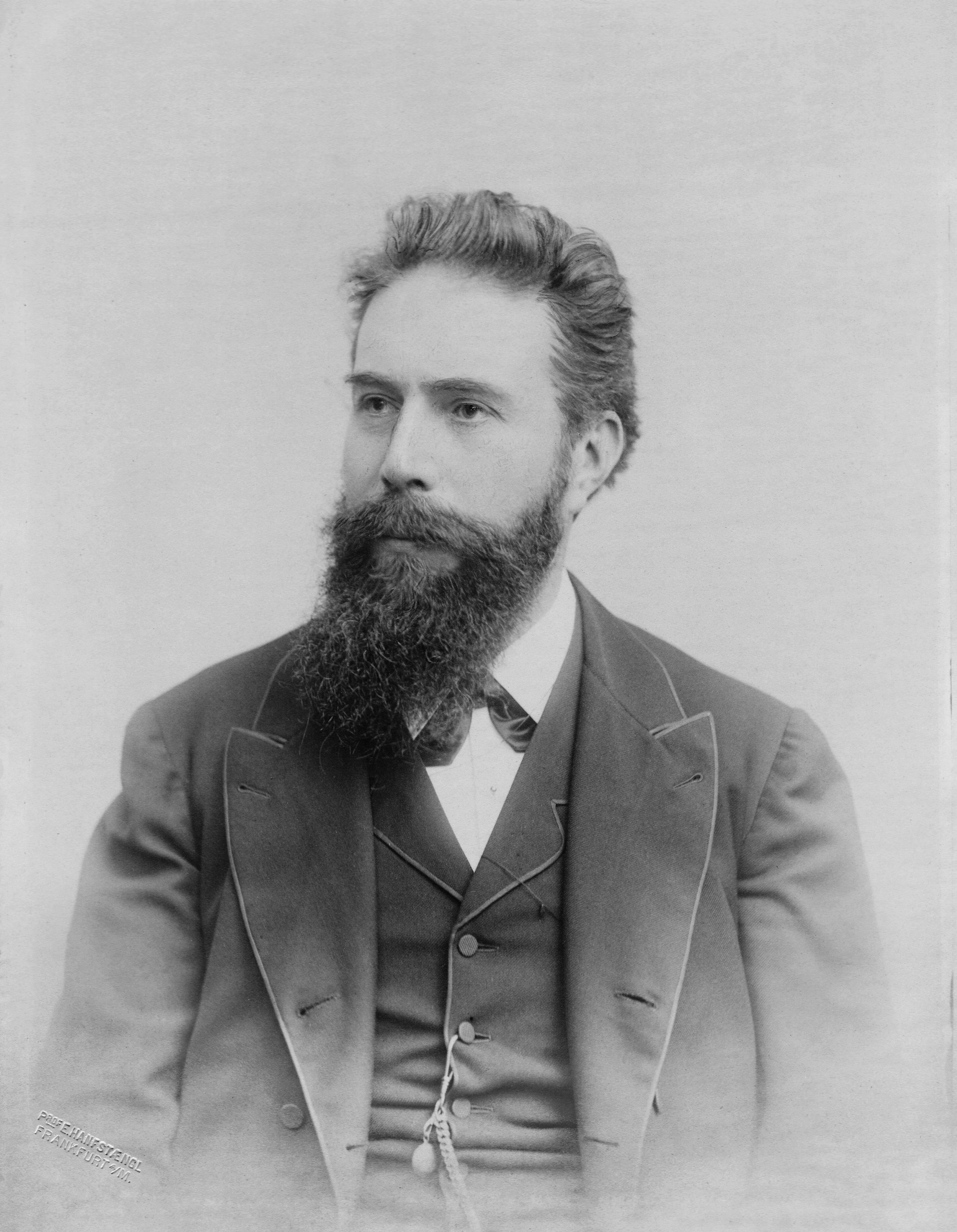
- Röntgen in 1900
- Born: Wilhelm Conrad Röntgen; 27 March 1845; Lennep, Prussia
- Died: 10 February 1923 (aged 77); Munich, Germany
- Citizenship: Prussia (until 1848); Stateless (1848–1888); Germany (from 1888)
- Education: Federal Polytechnic School: Diplom, Mechanical Engineering; University of Zurich: Dr. sc. nat., Physics; University of Strasbourg: Dr. habil., Physics
- Known for: Discovery of X-rays
- Spouse: Anna Bertha Ludwig (m. 1872; died 1919)
- Awards: Rumford Medal (1896); Matteucci Medal (1896); Elliott Cresson Medal (1897); Nobel Prize in Physics (1901)
- Scientific career
- Fields: Physics
- Workplaces: Academy of Agriculture; University of Strasbourg; University of Giessen; University of Würzburg; LMU Munich
- Thesis: Studien über Gase (1869)
- Doctoral advisor: Gustav Zeuner
- Doctoral students: Abram Ioffe; Rudolf Ladenburg; Herman March; Ernst Wagner

Wilhelm Conrad Röntgen (Note: /ˈrɛntɡən, ˈrʌnt-/ RENT-guhn, RUHNT-; German: [ˈvɪlhɛlm ˈʁœntɡən]; sometimes anglicized as Roentgen.) (27 March 1845 – 10 February 1923) was a German experimental physicist who produced and detected electromagnetic radiation in a wavelength range known as X-rays (known as Röntgen rays in many languages). In 1901, Röntgen became the first recipient of the Nobel Prize in Physics "in recognition of the extraordinary services he has rendered by the discovery of the remarkable rays subsequently named after him." The element roentgenium is named in his honor.

== Biography ==
=== Early life and education ===
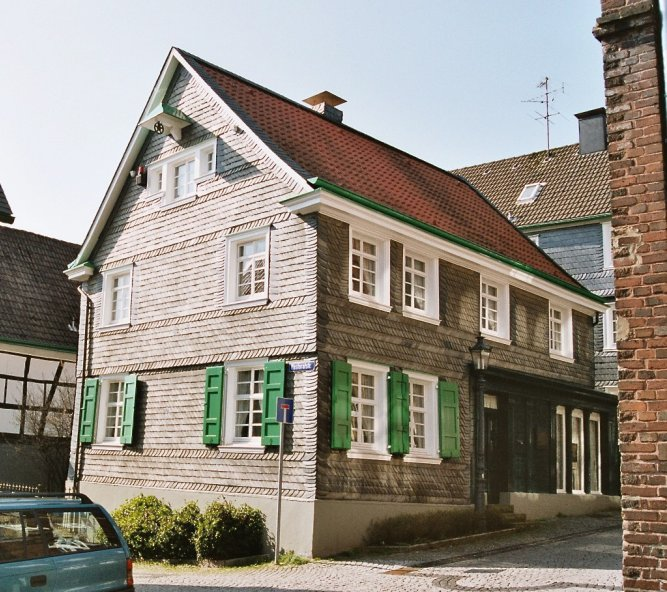
The house in Remscheid-Lennep, Germany, where Röntgen was born.

Wilhelm Conrad Röntgen was born on 27 March 1845 in Lennep (now part of Remscheid), Rhine Province, Prussia, the only child of Charlotte Constanze (née Frowein) and Friedrich Conrad Röntgen, a merchant and cloth manufacturer. In 1848, he moved with his parents to the Netherlands—where his mother's family lived—rendering him stateless.

In 1862, Röntgen enrolled at Utrecht Technical School, where he followed courses for almost two years. In 1865, he was unfairly expelled from the school when he was falsely accused of drawing a caricature of one of the teachers, which was actually drawn by someone else.

Without a high school diploma, Röntgen could only attend university in the Netherlands as a visitor. In 1865, he tried to attend Utrecht University without having the necessary credentials required for a regular student. He then moved to Switzerland and passed the entrance examination of the Federal Polytechnic School (now ETH Zurich) in Zurich, where he graduated with a Diplom in Mechanical Engineering in 1868. The following year, he received a Doctor of Science in Physics from the University of Zurich. At the Polytechnic School, Röntgen was the favorite student of Professor August Kundt, whom he followed to the University of Würzburg. Due to his lack of an Abitur, he was refused a habilitation by the university, and instead went to the University of Strasbourg, where he habilitated in 1874.

=== Career ===
In 1875, Röntgen became a professor at the Academy of Agriculture in Hohenheim. He returned to the University of Strasbourg the following year as Professor of Physics, and in 1879 was appointed to the Chair of Physics at the University of Giessen. In 1888, he reacquired German citizenship (after being stateless for 40 years) and obtained the physics chair at the University of Würzburg, and in 1900 at the Ludwig-Maximilians-Universität München, by special request of the Bavarian government.

Röntgen had family in Iowa in the United States and planned to emigrate. He accepted an appointment at Columbia University in New York City and bought transatlantic tickets. However, the outbreak of World War I changed his plans, and he remained in Munich for the rest of his career.

=== Later life and death ===
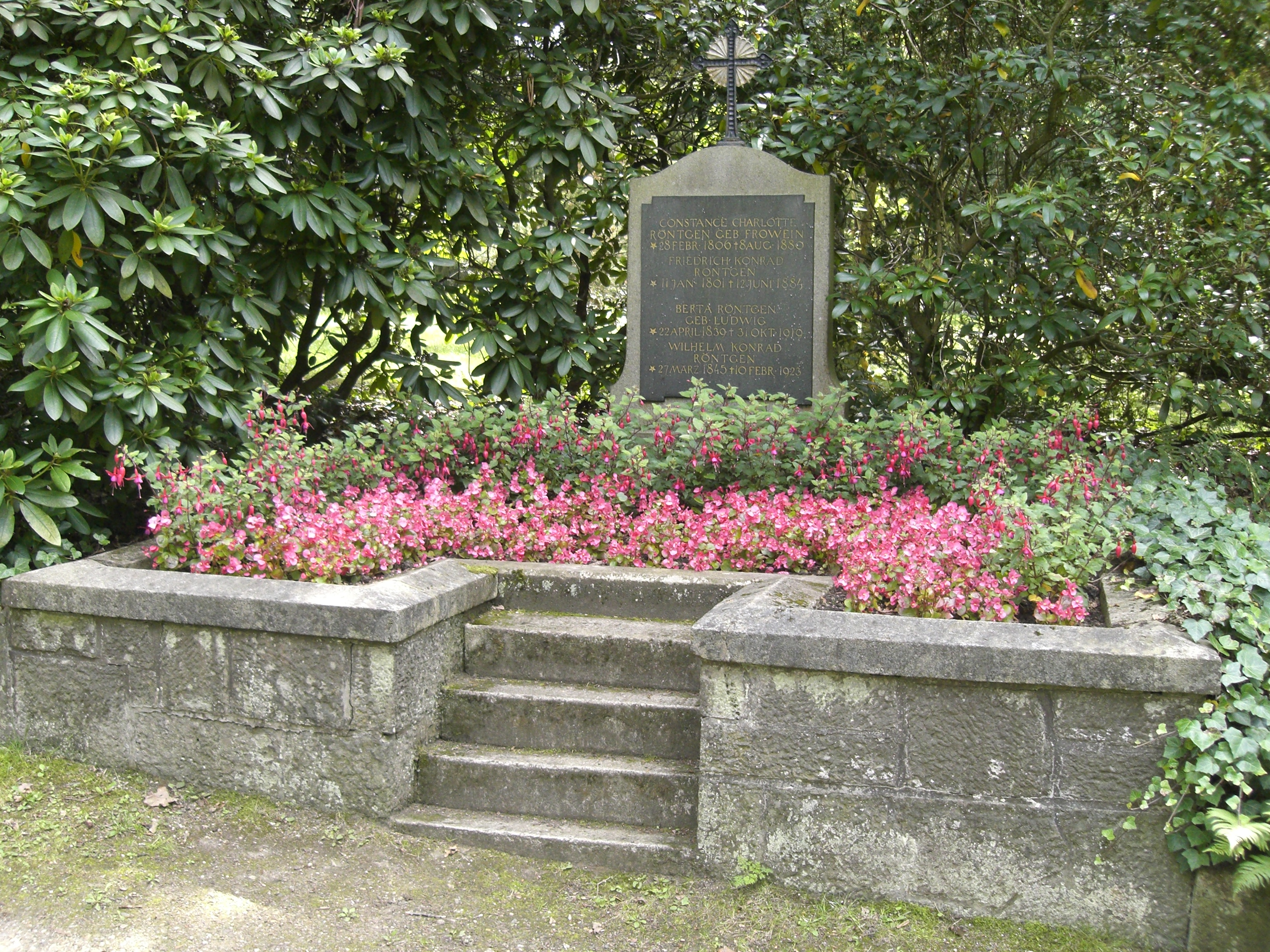
Grave of Wilhelm Röntgen (and relatives) in Alter Friedhof in Giessen.

With the inflation following World War I, Röntgen fell into bankruptcy, spending his final years at his country home in Weilheim.

Röntgen died of colorectal cancer on 10 February 1923 in Munich at the age of 77. In keeping with his will, his personal and scientific correspondence, with few exceptions, were destroyed upon his death. His will included numerous benefactions, including to his hometown of Lennep and the Physical Institute of the University of Würzburg.

== Discovery of X-rays ==
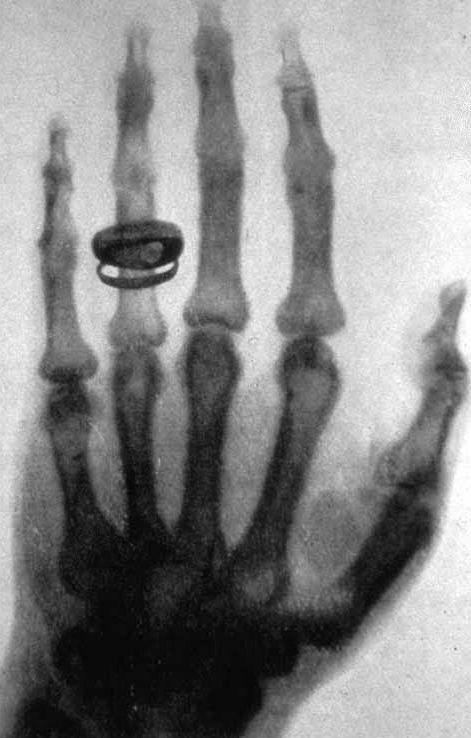
X-ray by Röntgen of Albert von Kölliker's hand.

In 1895, in his laboratory at the Physical Institute of the University of Würzburg, Röntgen was investigating the external effects of passing an electric discharge through various types of vacuum tube equipment—apparatuses from Heinrich Hertz, Johann Hittorf, William Crookes, Nikola Tesla, and Philipp Lenard. In early November, he was repeating an experiment with one of Lenard's tubes in which a thin aluminium window had been added to permit the cathode rays to exit the tube but a cardboard covering was added to protect the aluminium from damage by the strong electrostatic field that produces the cathode rays. He knew that the cardboard covering prevented light from escaping, yet he observed that the invisible cathode rays caused a fluorescent effect on a small cardboard screen painted with barium platinocyanide when it was placed close to the aluminium window. It occurred to Röntgen that the Crookes–Hittorf tube, which had a much thicker glass wall than the Lenard tube, might also cause this fluorescent effect.

In the late afternoon of 8 November 1895, Röntgen was determined to test his idea. He carefully constructed a black cardboard covering similar to the one he had used on the Lenard tube. He covered the Crookes–Hittorf tube with the cardboard and attached electrodes to an induction coil to generate an electrostatic charge. Before setting up the barium platinocyanide screen to test his idea, he darkened the room to test the opacity of his cardboard cover. As he passed the induction coil charge through the tube, he determined that the cover was light-tight and turned to prepare for the next step of the experiment. It was at this point that he noticed a faint shimmering from a bench a few feet away from the tube. To be sure, he tried several more discharges and saw the same shimmering each time. Striking a match, he discovered the shimmering had come from the location of the barium platinocyanide screen he had been intending to use next.

Based on the formation of regular shadows, Röntgen termed the phenomenon "rays." As 8 November was a Friday, he took advantage of the weekend to repeat his experiments and made his first notes. In the following weeks, he ate and slept in his laboratory as he investigated many properties of the new rays he temporarily termed "X-rays," using the mathematical designation ("X") for something unknown. The word for X-ray in German and some languages in Central and Eastern Europe are derived from Röntgen's name (and the associated X-ray radiograms as "Röntgenograms").

At one point, while he was investigating the ability of various materials to stop the rays, Röntgen brought a small piece of lead into position while a discharge was occurring. Röntgen thus saw the first radiographic image: his own flickering ghostly skeleton on the barium platinocyanide screen.

About six weeks after his discovery, Röntgen took a picture (a radiograph) using X-rays of his wife Anna Bertha's hand. When she saw her skeleton, she exclaimed "I have seen my death!" He later took a better picture of his friend Albert von Kölliker's hand at a public lecture.

Röntgen's original paper, Ueber eine neue Art von Strahlen (On a New Kind of Rays), was published on 28 December 1895. On 5 January 1896, an Austrian newspaper reported his discovery of a new type of radiation. He was awarded an honorary M.D. from the University of Würzburg after his discovery. He also received the Rumford Medal of the Royal Society in 1896, jointly with Philipp Lenard, who had already shown that a portion of the cathode rays could pass through a thin film of a metal such as aluminium. He published a total of three papers on X-rays between 1895 and 1897.

Röntgen's analysis and publications stirred enormous excitement among physicists. It led Henri Becquerel to look for connections with phosphorescence, leading to his discovery of spontaneous radioactivity in 1896. Marie and Pierre Curie were also taken by the X-ray work but upon hearing of Becquerel findings they returned to isolating and identifying radioactive isotopes leading to the recognition that the radiation was generated at the atomic level.

Röntgen was awarded the 1901 Nobel Prize in Physics "in recognition of the extraordinary services he has rendered by the discovery of the remarkable rays subsequently named after him." Shy in public speaking, he declined to give a Nobel lecture. Like Marie and Pierre Curie, he refused to take out patents related to his discovery of X-rays, as he wanted society as a whole to benefit from practical applications of the phenomenon.

== Personal life ==
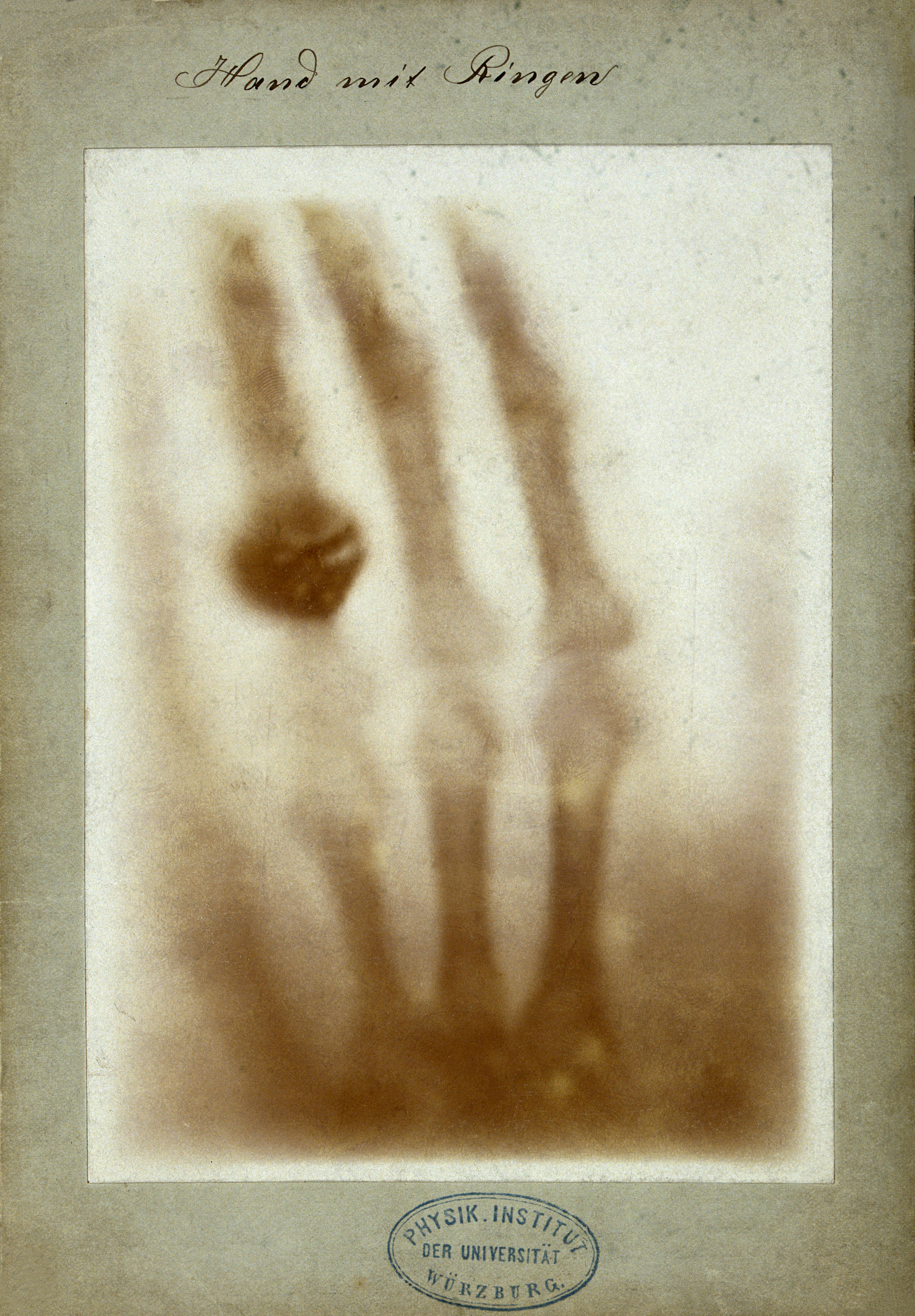
First X-ray by Röntgen of his wife Anna Bertha Ludwig's hand.

Röntgen was married to Anna Bertha Ludwig for 47 years until her death in 1919 at the age of 80. In 1866, they met in Zurich at Anna's father's café, Zum Grünen Glas. They became engaged in 1869 and wed in Apeldoorn, Netherlands, on 7 July 1872; the delay was due to Anna being six years Wilhelm's senior and his father disapproving of her age or humble background. Their marriage began with financial difficulties as family support from Röntgen had ceased. They raised one child, Josephine Bertha Ludwig, whom they adopted as a 6-year-old after her father, Anna's only brother, died in 1887.

Röntgen was a member of the Dutch Reformed Church.

== Recognition ==
=== Awards ===
Year	Organization	Award	Co-recipients	Citation	Ref.
1896	Royal Society	Rumford Medal	Philipp Lenard	"For their investigations of the phenomena produced outside a highly exhausted tube through which an electrical discharge is taking place."	
1896	Accademia dei XL	Matteucci Medal	Philipp Lenard	—	
1898	Franklin Institute	Elliott Cresson Medal	—	"For the discovery of X-rays."	
1901	Royal Swedish Academy of Sciences	Nobel Prize in Physics	—	"In recognition of the extraordinary services he has rendered by the discovery of the remarkable rays subsequently named after him."	

=== Memberships ===
Year	Organization	Type	Ref.
1897	American Philosophical Society	International Member	
1907	Royal Netherlands Academy of Arts and Sciences	Foreign Member	

=== Honors ===
Year	Country	Honor	Ref.
1911	Germany	Pour le Mérite	

== Commemoration ==
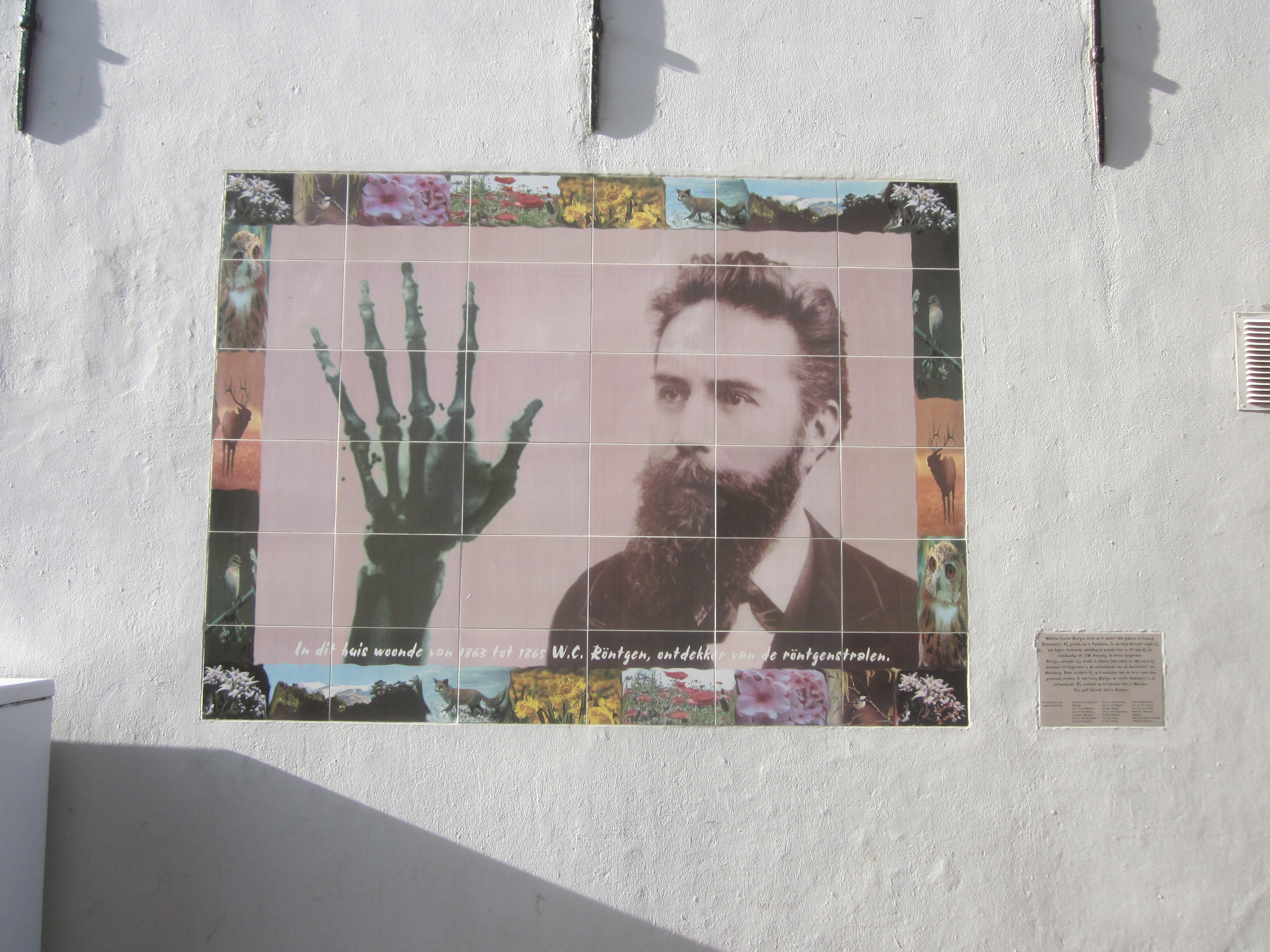
Wall art by the house where Röntgen lived from 1863 until 1865 on Schalkwijkstraat in Utrecht. Made by Jackie Sleper in 2005.

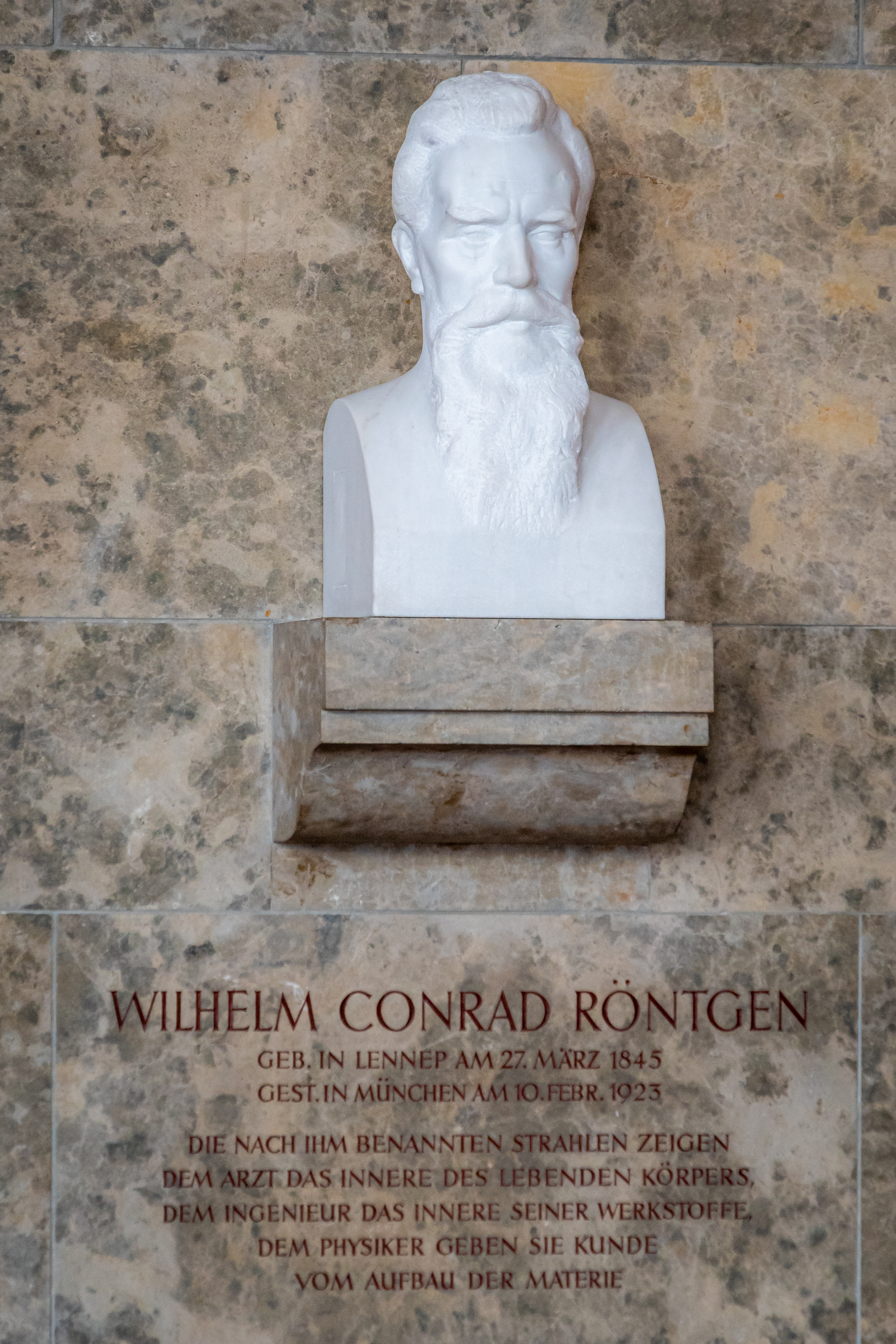
Röntgen's marble bust at the Deutsches Museum in Munich.

In November 2004, the IUPAC named element number 111 roentgenium (Rg) in his honor. The IUPAP adopted the name in November 2011.

A collection of Röntgen's papers is held at the National Library of Medicine in Bethesda, Maryland.

Today, in Remscheid-Lennep, 40 kilometres east of Röntgen's birthplace in Düsseldorf, is the Deutsches Röntgen-Museum.

In Würzburg, where Röntgen discovered X-rays, a non-profit organization maintains his laboratory and provides guided tours to the Röntgen Memorial Site.

World Radiography Day is an annual event promoting the role of medical imaging in modern healthcare. It is celebrated on 8 November each year, coinciding with the anniversary of Röntgen's discovery. It was first introduced in 2012 as a joint initiative between the European Society of Radiology, the Radiological Society of North America, and the American College of Radiology.

As of 2023, 55 stamps from 40 countries have been issued commemorating Röntgen as the discoverer of X-rays.

Röntgen Peak in Antarctica is named after Wilhelm Röntgen.

Minor planet 6401 Roentgen is named after him.

In 2010, Röntgen's discovery was honored in a Google doodle.

== See also ==
- German inventors and discoverers
- Röntgen Memorial Site
- Ivan Puluj
