= Emig (disambiguation) =

Emig is a surname.

Emig may also refer to:

- Emig Mansion, a historic home in York County, Pennsylvania, United States
- European Medical Devices Industry Group, a non-profit trade association
