= European Institute for Biomedical Imaging Research =

Non-profit company

The European Institute for Biomedical Imaging Research (EIBIR) was established in 2006 as a non-profit, limited liability company on the initiative of the European Society of Radiology with funding of the European Commission within the Sixth Framework Programme.

== Activities ==
EIBIR aims to improve cooperation between research institutes, academic departments and industry that form the European biomedical imaging community with the goal of improving the diagnosis, treatment and prevention of diseases. It actively supports research networking activities and common initiatives and interoperability in the field of biomedical imaging research.

The majority of its efforts concern project management services for ongoing collaborative research projects, coordination of multi-center clinical trials, and support during the preparation of project proposals under the European Commission's Horizon 2020 framework.

The current research focus lies in radiology, molecular imaging and imaging biomarkers. The main target audiences include physicians, physicists, radiographers, chemists, mathematicians, molecular biologists, computer scientists.

== History ==
In 2000, the idea of creating a body that would work to improve European image-related research activities emerged within the former European Association of Radiology (EAR) which was later integrated into the European Society for Radiology (ESR).

In 2002, the EAR created a committee to supervise imaging research activities in Europe, and to offer advice on how to establish a body tasked with improving and coordinating biomedical imaging research in Europe.

At the European Congress of Radiology in 2004, the committee presented an overview of the existing European research infrastructure. The committee recommended determining partners in order to properly establish a pan-European research institute, analogous to the National Institute of Biomedical Imaging and Bioengineering in the United States. Based on these recommendations, a second committee was created with the aim to build a network of research centers of excellence in biomedical imaging, and creating possibilities for the education and strengthening of biomedical imaging research and training throughout Europe.

An action plan entitled "Towards a European Institute for Biomedical Imaging Research" was developed by the second committee in 2005, and submitted within the 6th Framework Programme to the European Commission.

In 2006, the action plan was approved and led to the official establishment of EIBIR as a non-profit limited liability company with its registered office in Vienna, Austria. EIBIR received financial support from a core group of industry partners in order to facilitate the establishment of its operational structures and to initiate projects at a research level. Bayer Schering Pharma, Bracco, GE Healthcare, Philips and Siemens Healthcare were the founding members of the EIBIR Industry Panel.

From 2008 onward, EIBIR took over the coordination of several collaborative research projects supported within the European Commission's Seventh Framework Programme and collaborated in additional projects.

By 2009, EIBIR's network and activities had grown to a point where there was a need for a strategic plan to ensure efficiency, viability and a focused use of its resources; Service packages were introduced for network members, industry partners and shareholder organisations in order to allow EIBIR to maintain and improve its services.

== Research project ==
As of May 2015, EIBIR has been, or currently is, involved in the following projects:

- Euro-BioImaging – European Research Infrastructure for Imaging Technologies in Biological and Biomedical Sciences
- VPH-PRISM‡ – Virtual Physiological Human: Personalized Predictive Breast Cancer Therapy through Integrated Tissue Micro-Structure Modeling
- MITIGATE – Closed-loop Molecular Environment for Minimally Invasive Treatment of Patients with Metastatic Gastrointestinal Stromal Tumours
- VPH-DARE@IT – Virtual Physiological Human: DementiA Research Enabled by IT
- ENCITE‡ – European Network for Cell Imaging and Tracking Expertise
- HAMAM‡ – Highly Accurate Breast Cancer Diagnosis through Integration of Biological Knowledge, Novel Imaging Modalities, and Modelling
- PEDDOSE.NET‡ – Dosimetry and Health Effects of Diagnostic Applications of Radiopharmaceuticals with Particular Emphasis on the Use in Children and Adolescents
- RAMIRI – Realising and Managing International Research Infrastructures

‡ under project coordination of EIBIR

== Structure ==
EIBIR is managed by an executive director and its offices are located in Vienna, Austria. The scientific activities of EIBIR are led by a scientific advisory board, which is chaired by the scientific director. Within EIBIR there currently are seven thematic working groups collaborating on multiple aspects ranging from education to initializing collaborative research projects. The themes covered by these working groups are;

- Biomedical image analysis
- Assessment of imaging in medicine
- Cancer imaging
- Development of imaging probes
- Cell imaging
- Paediatric radiology
- Image guided radiotherapy

As of May 2015, over 160 research institutions and industry partners from 23 European countries are EIBIR network member. The main decision-making body of EIBIR, the General Meeting, consists of one representative per shareholder organization. As of May 2015, there are 12 shareholder organizations;

- European Society of Radiology
- Cardiovascular and Interventional Radiological Society of Europe
- COCIR
- European Association of Nuclear Medicine
- European Federation of Organisations in Medical Physics
- European Organisation for Research and Treatment of Cancer
- European Society for Molecular Imaging
- European Society for Magnetic Resonance in Medicine and Biology
- European Society of Paediatric Radiology
- European SocieTy for Radiotherapy & Oncology
- European Society of Medical Imaging Informatics
- European Federation of Radiographer Societies

In addition to the shareholder organizations, there are six industry panel members, consisting of the following supporting companies;

- Barco
- Bayer Healthcare
- Bracco
- GE Healthcare
- Philips
- Siemens Healthcare
