= Gabriel Krestin =

Romanian radiologist

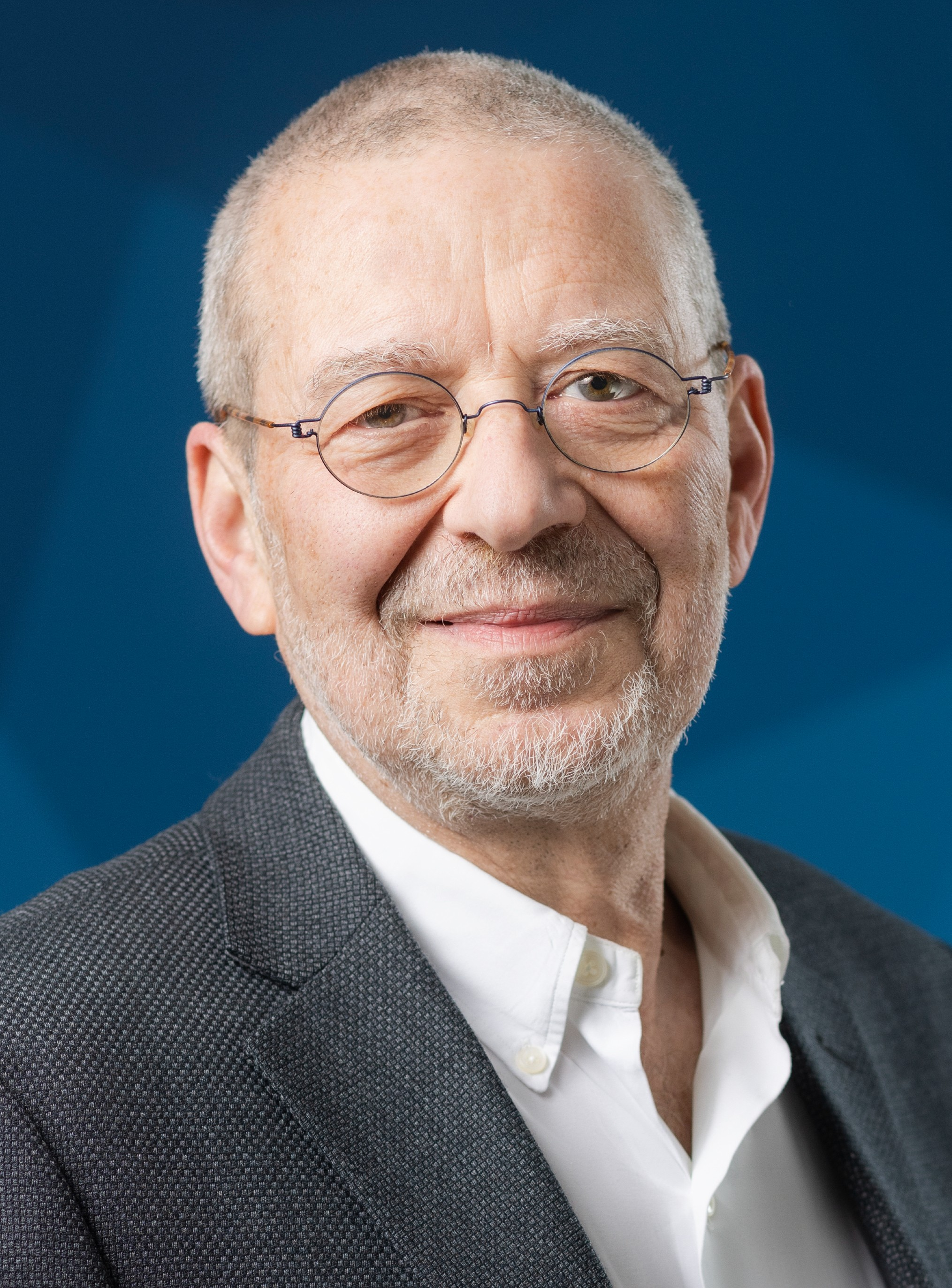
- Krestin in 2023
- Born: Gabriel P. Krestin; Romania
- Occupation: Radiologist
- Awards: Order of the Dutch Lion (2022)

Academic background
- Education: University of Cologne

Academic work
- Institutions: Erasmus University Rotterdam

Gabriel P. Krestin is a German radiologist. He is an emeritus professor of radiology at Erasmus MC, in the Netherlands.

== Early life and education ==
Krestin was born in Romania, and emigrated to Germany in 1974. He graduated in 1981 from the Faculty of Medicine at the University of Cologne, where he also completed his radiology training and PhD in 1989.

== Career ==
In 1990, he joined the Department of Radiology at the University Hospital of Zürich, becoming associate professor of radiology and head of clinical radiology in 1993. He served as acting chair of the department from 1995 until 1997, when he moved to the Netherlands to become professor and chair of the Department of Radiology at Erasmus MC. Between 1998 and 2010, he was also a visiting professor at Stanford University Medical School.

From 2013 to 2021, he chaired the Division of Diagnostics & Advice at Erasmus MC and served as a member of the medical staff's managing board. During 2016–2017, Krestin was the acting director of the Department of Pharmacy and integrated nuclear medicine and radiology into the Department of Radiology & Nuclear Medicine. Under his leadership the Department of Radiology and Nuclear Medicine at Erasmus MC developed to one of the leading scientific institutions in medical imaging in Europe. In the almost 25 years of his tenure the faculty grew from around 20 radiologists to almost 100 physicians and scientists.

Krestin was the founder (in 2006) of the European Institute for Biomedical Imaging Research (EIBIR) located in Vienna and chaired its Shareholder Assembly until 2014 and became subsequently its Scientific Director until 2023. The Institute is a non-profit research organization owned by the major European scientific societies involved in the field of biomedical imaging. EIBIR shapes the landscape of European biomedical imaging research by supporting scientists and helping them secure funding for their innovative projects.

Krestin retired as chair at Erasmus MC in 2021 and now serves as an advisor and board member for multiple medical technology companies. He is the founder of Quantib BV, an AI company focused on image analysis, was a board member of FLUIDDA NV, Gleamer.ai, and is currently on the board of Holland PTC, Chipiron, Nuclivision, Rayscape and Brightheart. He chairs the board of LeQuest BV and serves as a strategic advisor to companies including Bracco S.p.A.

== Recognition ==
Krestin was awarded the Couch-Kerley Traveling Professorship of the Royal College of Radiologists (UK), the Albers-Schönberg Medal of the German Radiological Society, the Schinz Medal from the Swiss Society of Medical Radiology, and gold medals from the European Society of Radiology, the Asian Oceanian Society of Radiology, and the International Society for Strategic Studies in Radiology (IS3R). He is an honorary fellow of the American College of Radiology and the Royal College of Radiologists in the UK. He was elected to the U.S. National Academy of Medicine in 2017, to the Academia Europaea in 2023, and became a Knight of the Order of the Dutch Lion in 2022.

== Books (selected) ==
- Computed Tomography of the Coronary Arteries. CRC Press. December 22, 2004.
- Acute Abdomen: Diagnostic Imaging In The Clinical Context. Thieme Medical Publishers. November 1, 2010. ISBN 978-1588901484.
