= Ángel Alberich-Bayarri =

Spanish engineer and biomedical researcher

Ángel Alberich-Bayarri (born February 9, 1984, in Benicarló, Spain) is a Spanish telecommunications engineer, biomedical researcher and entrepreneur. In 2015, the Massachusetts Institute of Technology recognized him as one of its Innovators Under 35. Ángel Alberich-Bayarri is the co-founder and chief executive officer (CEO) of Quibim, a company specializing in advanced medical imaging analysis and healthcare technologies.

== Education ==
Between 2002 and 2007, Ángel Alberich-Bayarri pursued higher education at the Technical University of Valencia (UPV), where he earned a degree in Telecommunications Engineering with a specialization in Electronics. In 2010, he continued his studies at UPV and obtained a PhD in Biomedical Engineering. His doctoral research focused on innovative image processing techniques for magnetic resonance imaging (MRI), contributing to advancements in the field of biomedical imaging.

== Career ==
Following his academic training, Alberich-Bayarri contributed to both clinical research and biomedical engineering. From 2007 to 2014, he was actively involved in research and development at Grupo Hospitalario Quirón, where he later served as Coordinator of Biomedical Engineering from 2012 to 2014. Working at Hospital Universitario y Politécnico La Fe in Valencia, he held the position of Scientific-Technical Director at the Biomedical Imaging Research Group.

In 2012, Ángel Alberich-Bayarri received the UPV Doctoral Award for the Best PhD in Information and Communication Technologies and was honored with the European Society of Radiology Award for Best Scientific Paper. In 2013, he was awarded the Pro-Academia Prize for outstanding scientific leadership on a European level. The following year, in 2014, he earned the European Society of Radiology Award for Best Contribution to Oncology Research. In 2015, Ángel Alberich-Bayarri co-founded Quibim, a spin-off company dedicated to transforming healthcare through the application of quantitative imaging biomarkers. Quibim uses AI, machine learning, and cloud computing to improve diagnostics and treatment planning in oncology, immunology, and neurology. The company collaborates with leading hospitals, pharmaceutical firms, equipment manufacturers, and research institutions worldwide.

In 2015, the Massachusetts Institute of Technology recognized him as one of its Innovators Under 35, celebrating him as a leading innovator. In 2017, he was named the Cultural Ambassador of Benicarló. In 2021, he received the "Amigo de la Radiología" award from the SERAM Radiology Awards for his research on advanced image processing methods in magnetic resonance imaging. In 2024, he received the Fundación Mutualidad de la Ingeniería Award. He has authored over 100 scientific articles in leading international journals, and has six patented inventions. His published one international book and contributed 20 book chapters. He serves as a member of the Board of Directors at the European Society of Medical Imaging Informatics (EUSOMII) and is a member of the e-Health Committee at the European Society of Radiology. Additionally, he holds the position of Vice President at Fundación Imaging and is the founder of ABACS (Association for the Promotion of Science and Health).

== Academic activity ==
He has served as a lecturer and mentor at the Universitat Politècnica de València, where he supervised numerous undergraduate and doctoral research projects. He also contributed to courses on advanced medical imaging for medicine students at the Universitat de València. He also taught postgraduate programs at the University of Zaragoza and the University of Granada, covering subjects such as Biomedical Engineering and Advanced Diagnostic and Therapeutic Radiology.
