= Röntgen Memorial Site =

Coordinates: 49.799998°N 9.930881°E

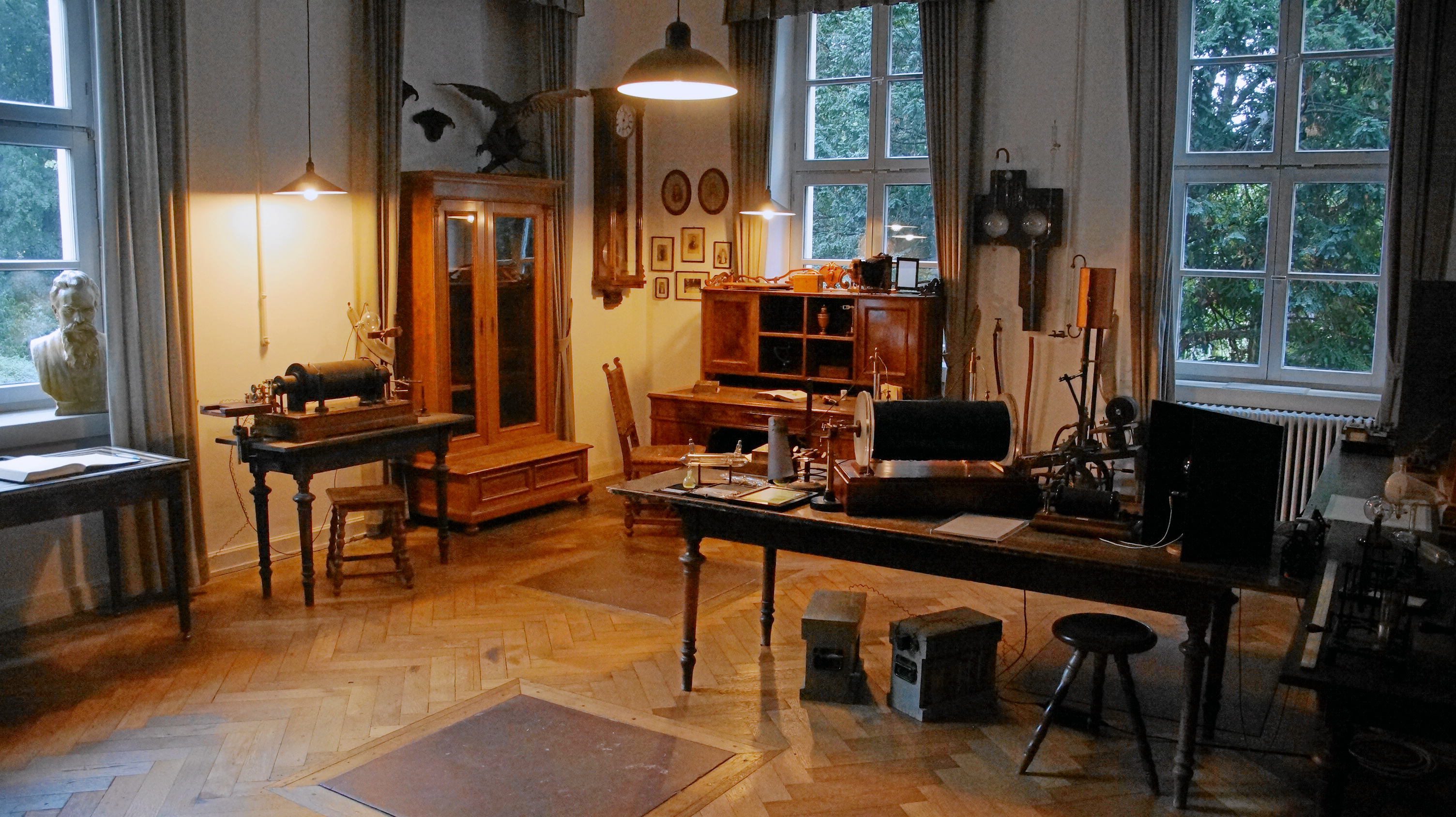
Röntgen Memorial Site, Röntgenring 8, Würzburg

The Röntgen Memorial Site in Würzburg, Germany, is dedicated to the work of the German physicist Wilhelm Conrad Röntgen (1845–1923) and his discovery of X-rays, for which he was granted the first Nobel Prize in physics, in 1901. It contains an exhibition of historical instruments, machines and documents.

== Location ==
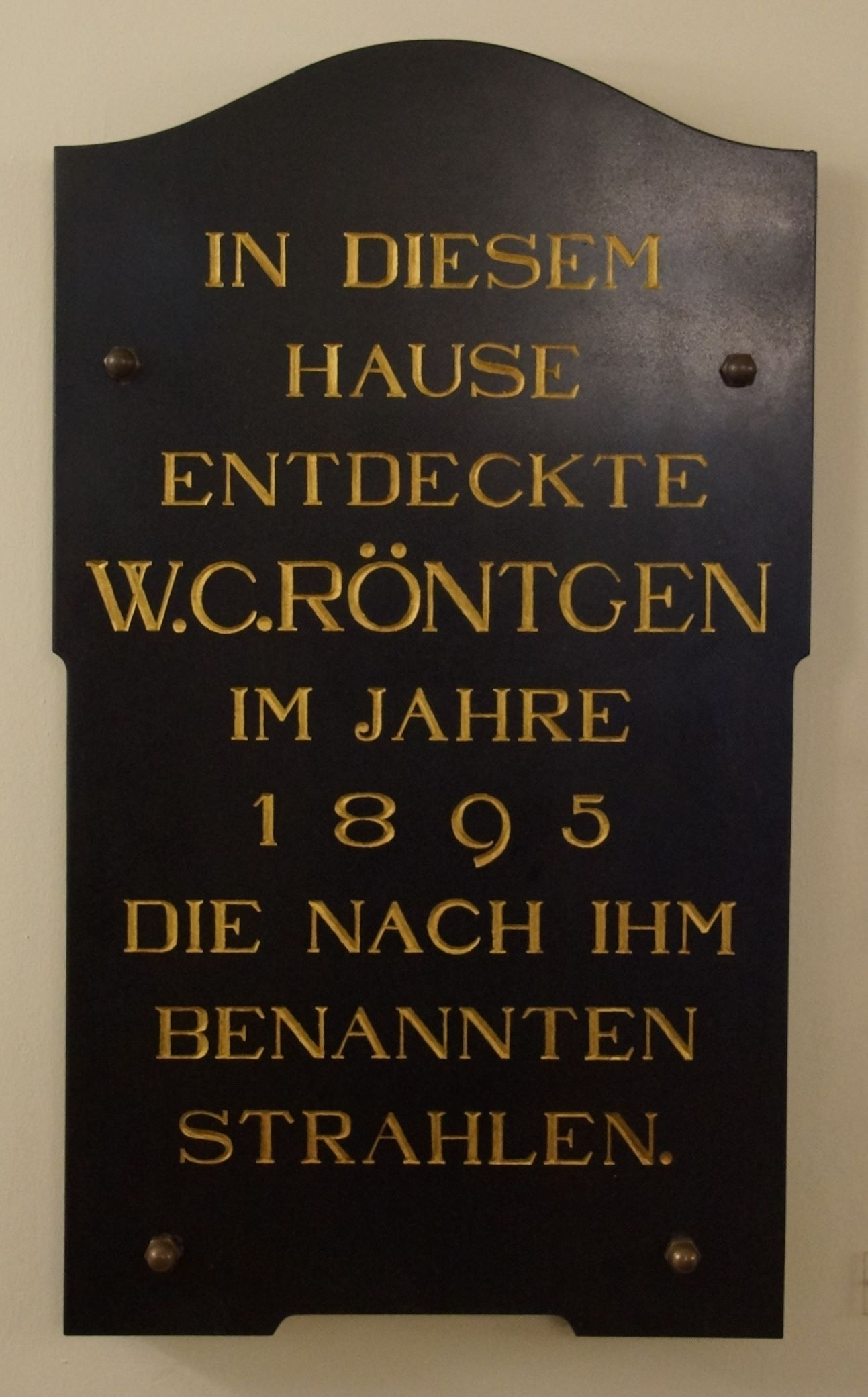
Memorial Stone inside the Röntgen Memorial Site

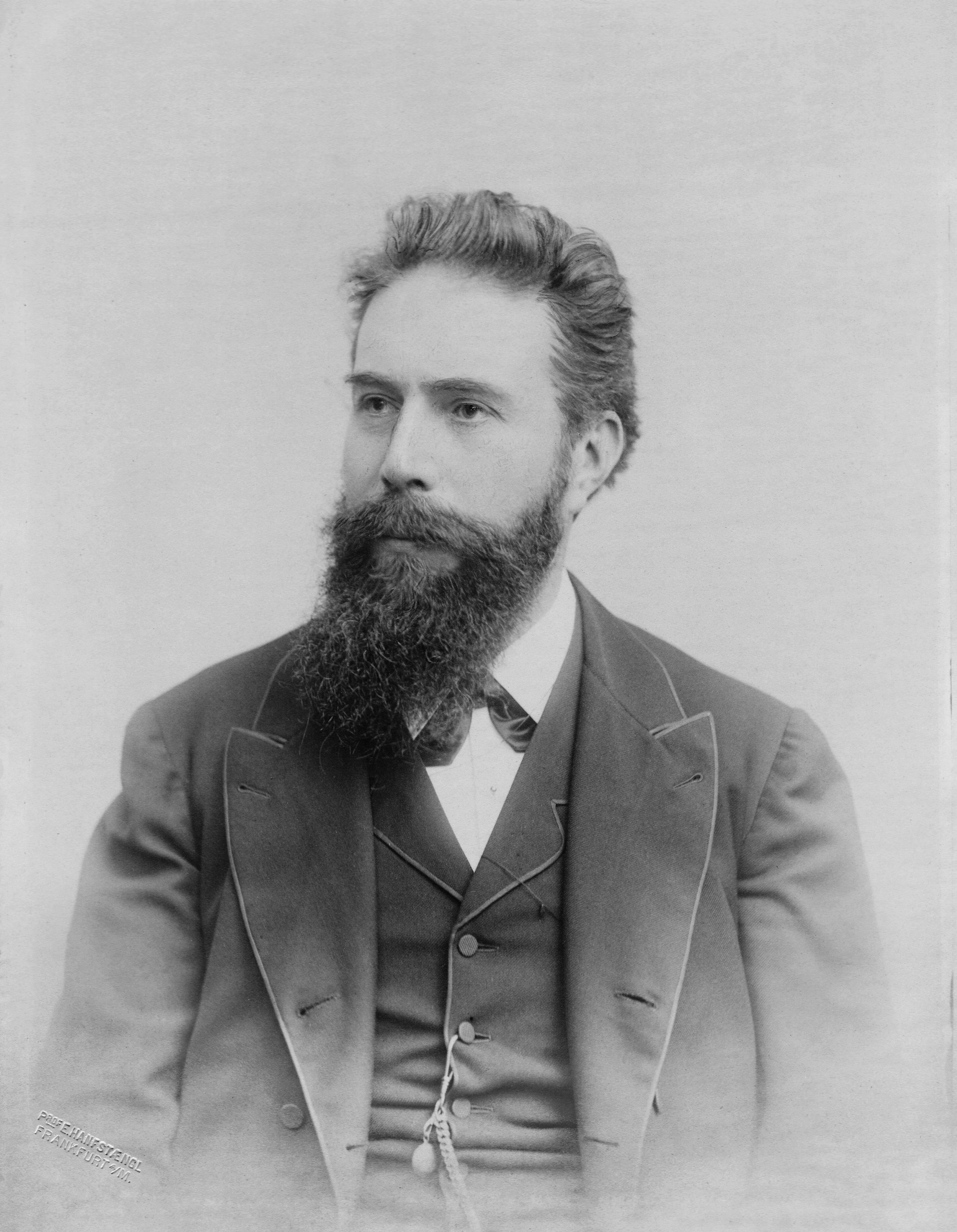
Wilhelm Conrad Röntgen

The Röntgen Memorial Site is in the foyer, corridors and two laboratory rooms of the former Physics Institute of the University of Würzburg in Röntgenring 8, a building that is now used by the University of Applied Sciences Würzburg-Schweinfurt. The road, where the building lies, was renamed in 1909 from Pleicherring to Röntgenring.

== History ==
On the late Friday evening of 8 November 1895, Röntgen discovered for the first time the rays which penetrate through solid materials and gave them the name X-rays. He presented this in a lecture and publication On a new type of rays - Über eine neue Art von Strahlen on 23 January 1896 at the Physical Medical Society of Würzburg.

During the discussion of this lecture, the anatomist Albert von Kölliker proposed to call these rays Röntgen radiation after their inventor, a term that is still being used in Germany.

== Exhibition ==
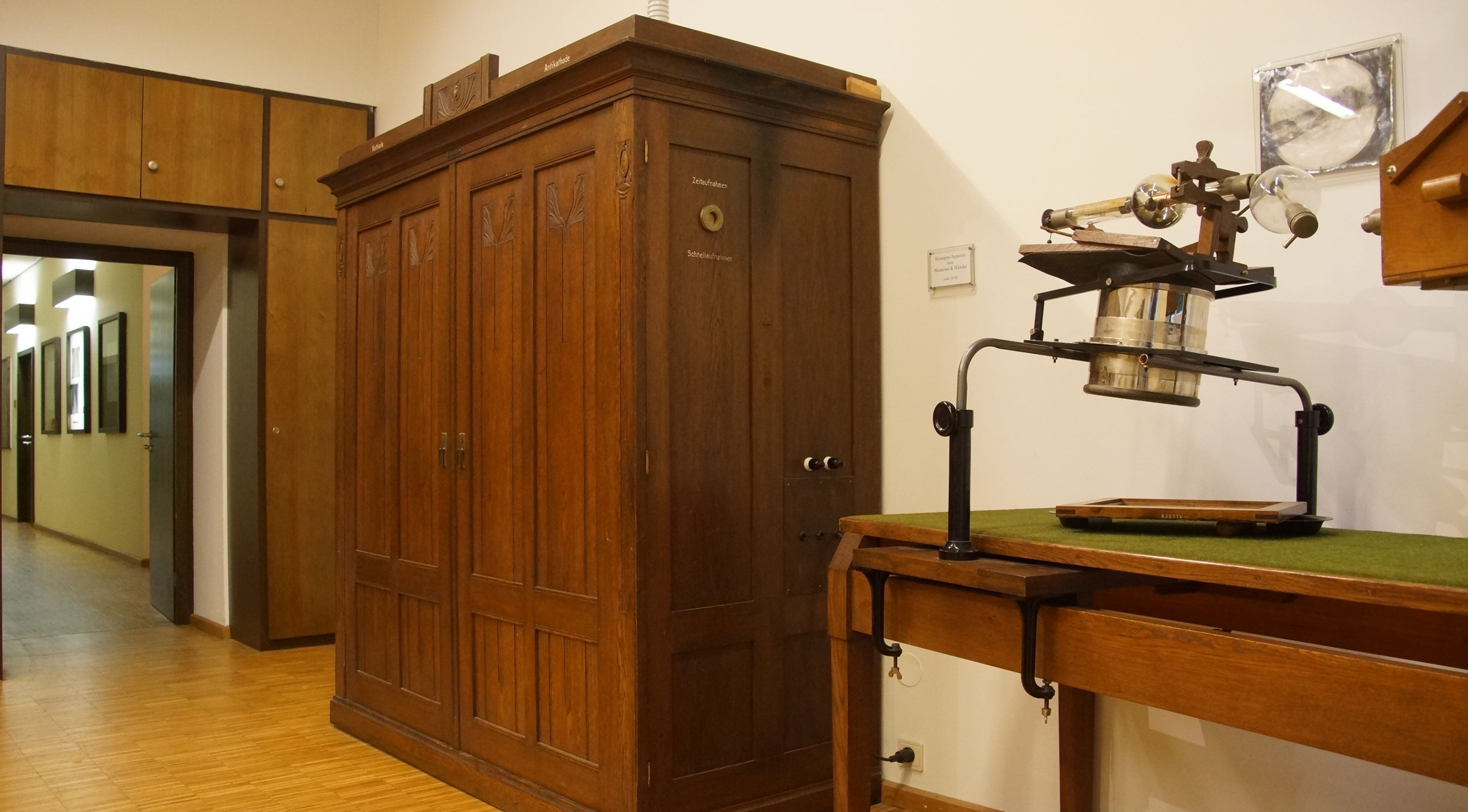
X-ray machine of Siemens und Halske from 1912

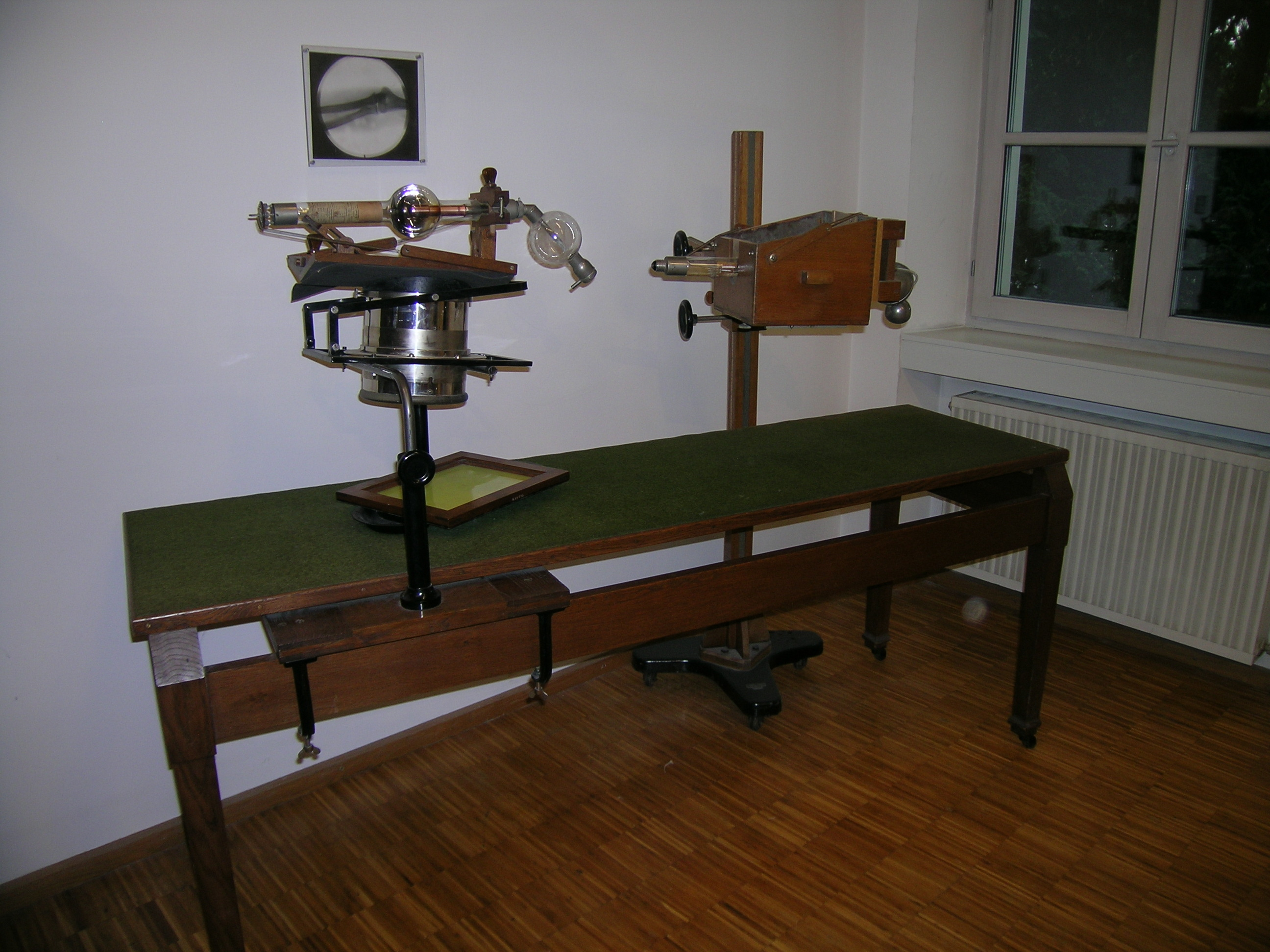
Two X-ray tubes

The Röntgen Memorial Site gives an insight into the particle physics of the late 19th century. It shows an experimental set-up of cathodic rays beside the apparatus of the discovery. An experiment of penetrating solid materials by X-rays is shown in the historic laboratory of Röntgen. A separate room shows various X-ray tubes, a medical X-ray machine of Siemens & Halske from 1912 and several original documents. In the foyer a short German movie explains the purpose of the Memorial Site and the life of Röntgen. In the corridor some personal belongings of Röntgen are displayed to give some background information on his personal and historical circumstances.

After remodeling in 2015 the tables and captures of the exhibition are now in English and German language.

== Society ==
The site is managed by the non-profit organisation Kuratorium zur Förderung des Andenkens an Wilhelm Conrad Röntgen in Würzburg e.V.. It offers guided tours to Röntgen's lab.
