= Radiology (journal) =

- Discipline: Radiology
- Language: English
- Edited by: Suhny Abbara, MD

Publication details
- History: 1923-present
- Publisher: Radiological Society of North America (United States)
- Frequency: Monthly
- Open access: After 1 year
- Impact factor: 17.6 (2025)

Standard abbreviations
- ISO 4: Radiology

Indexing
- CODEN: RADLAX
- ISSN: 0033-8419 (print); 1527-1315 (web)
- LCCN: 24011915
- OCLC no.: 1763380

Links
- Journal homepage; Online access; Online archive

Radiology is a monthly, peer reviewed, medical journal, owned and published by the Radiological Society of North America. The editor is Suhny Abbara, MD. The focus of Radiology is imaging research articles in radiology and medical imaging.

== Publishing formats ==
Publishing formats are original research articles (3000 words), research letters (600 words), technical developments (2000), invited perspectives (2500), review articles (4500), special report, invited editorial, statements and guidelines (3000), Images in Radiology, Radiology Diagnosis Please, and letter to the editor.

== Abstracting and indexing ==
According to the Journal Citation Reports, Radiology has a 2025 impact factor of 17.6. In addition, the journal is indexed in the following databases:

- Science Citation Index
- SciSearch
- Chemical Abstracts
- Current Contents/Clinical Medicine
- Current Contents/Life Sciences
- BIOSIS Previews
- Computer & Control Abstracts
- Electrical & Electronics Abstracts
- Physics Abstracts - Science Abstracts
- CIS Abstracts
- Life Sciences Collection
- Energy Research Abstracts
- Biological Abstracts
- Chemical Abstracts
- Index Medicus
- International Aerospace Abstracts
- International Nursing Index
- Nuclear Science Abstracts
