= Herman March =

German American mathematician

Herman William March (1878 – 1953) was a mathematician and physicist.

March studied physics and mathematics at the Ludwig-Maximilians-Universität München under Wilhelm Röntgen and Arnold Sommerfeld. He received his doctorate in 1911. He had a position at the University of Wisconsin–Madison no later than circa 1920. He died in 1953.

== Partial literature ==
- 1917: Calculus. Herman W. March and Henry C. Wolff. McGraw-Hill, New York.
- 1925: The Deflection of a Rectangular Plate Fixed at the Edges, Transactions of the American Mathematical Society, 27(3): 307–317
- 1927: The Heaviside Operational Calculus, Bulletin of the American Mathematical Society 33: 311–8.
- 1928: (with Warren Weaver) The Diffusion Problem for a Solid in Contact with a Stirred Liquid, Physical Review 31: 1072 - 1082.
- 1936: Bending of a Centrally Loaded Rectangular Strip of Plywood, Journal of Applied Physics 7(1): 32–41.
- 1953: The Field of a Magnetic Dipole in the Presence of a Conducting Sphere, Geophysics 18(3): 671–684.
