= European Radiology =

- Discipline: Radiology
- Language: English
- Edited by: Bernd Hamm

Publication details
- History: 1991-present
- Publisher: Springer Science+Business Media
- Frequency: Monthly
- Impact factor: 4.7 (2023)

Standard abbreviations
- ISO 4: Eur. Radiol.

Indexing
- ISSN: 0938-7994 (print); 1432-1084 (web)

Links
- Journal homepage; Homepage; Submission

European Radiology is a monthly peer-reviewed medical journal published by Springer Science+Business Media. It was established in 1991 by J. Lissner and is the official journal of the European Society of Radiology. The current editor-in-chief is Bernd Hamm. The following European societies of sub-disciplines have chosen European Radiology as their official organ:

- European Society of Breast Imaging (EUSOBI)
- European Society of Cardiac Radiology (ESCR)
- European Society of Gastrointestinal and Abdominal Radiology (ESGAR)
- European Society of Emergency Radiology (ESER)
- European Society of Head and Neck Radiology (ESHNR)
- European Society of Molecular and Functional Imaging in Radiology (ESMOFIR)
- European Society of Oncologic Imaging (ESOI)
- European Society of Thoracic Imaging (ESTI)
- European Society of Urogenital Radiology (ESUR)
- The EuroPACS Association

According to the Journal Citation Reports, the journal has a 2014 impact factor of 4.014.
