= World Radiography Day =

International observance, 8 November

- Observed by: Worldwide
- Type: International
- Significance: Anniversary of the discovery of X-ray, the role of Radiographers, and awareness of the benefits of medical imaging
- Date: November 8
- Next time: 8 November 2027
- Frequency: Yearly

World Radiography Day marks the anniversary of the discovery of X-rays in 1895. The purpose of this day is to raise public awareness of radiographic imaging and therapy, which play a crucial role in the diagnosis and the treatment of patients and, most importantly, ensuring radiation is kept to the minimum required, hence improving the quality of patient care. The day is celebrated worldwide by various national radiographers' associations and societies, including Nigeria's Association of Radiographers of Nigeria, United Kingdom's Society of Radiographers (SoR), among others. The International Society of Radiographers and Radiological Technologists have celebrated 8 November as World Radiography Day since 2007.

== See also ==
- International Day of Radiology
