= European Medical Devices Industry Group =

The European Medical Devices Industry Group (EMIG) is a non-profit trade association, and represents the medical devices industry in Europe as defined by the European Union Medical Devices Directives (93/42/EEC). Karen Howes is the current chair person of EMIG.

== See also ==
- COCIR
- European Economic Area (EEA)
- Medical Devices Directive
- Medicines and Healthcare products Regulatory Agency (MHRA)

== Sources ==
- MEDICAL DEVICES – INTERNATIONAL COOPERATION
- Directory of Study Group 5 Members (GHTF)
