= COCIR =

Trade association for the medical technology industry in Europe

COCIR logo

COCIR is the European Coordination Committee of the Radiological, Electromedical and Healthcare IT Industry. It is a non-profit trade association, which was founded in 1959, and represents the medical technology industry in Europe. Since 2006 COCIR headquarters are located in Brussels. In 2007, Heinrich von Wulfen became its chairman and succeeded Frank Anton. COCIR is a member of the European Medical Devices Industry Group (EMIG).

== See also ==
- DICOM
- Electronic health record
- Health Level 7
- Medical device – Medical technology
- NEMA
