= European Congress of Radiology =

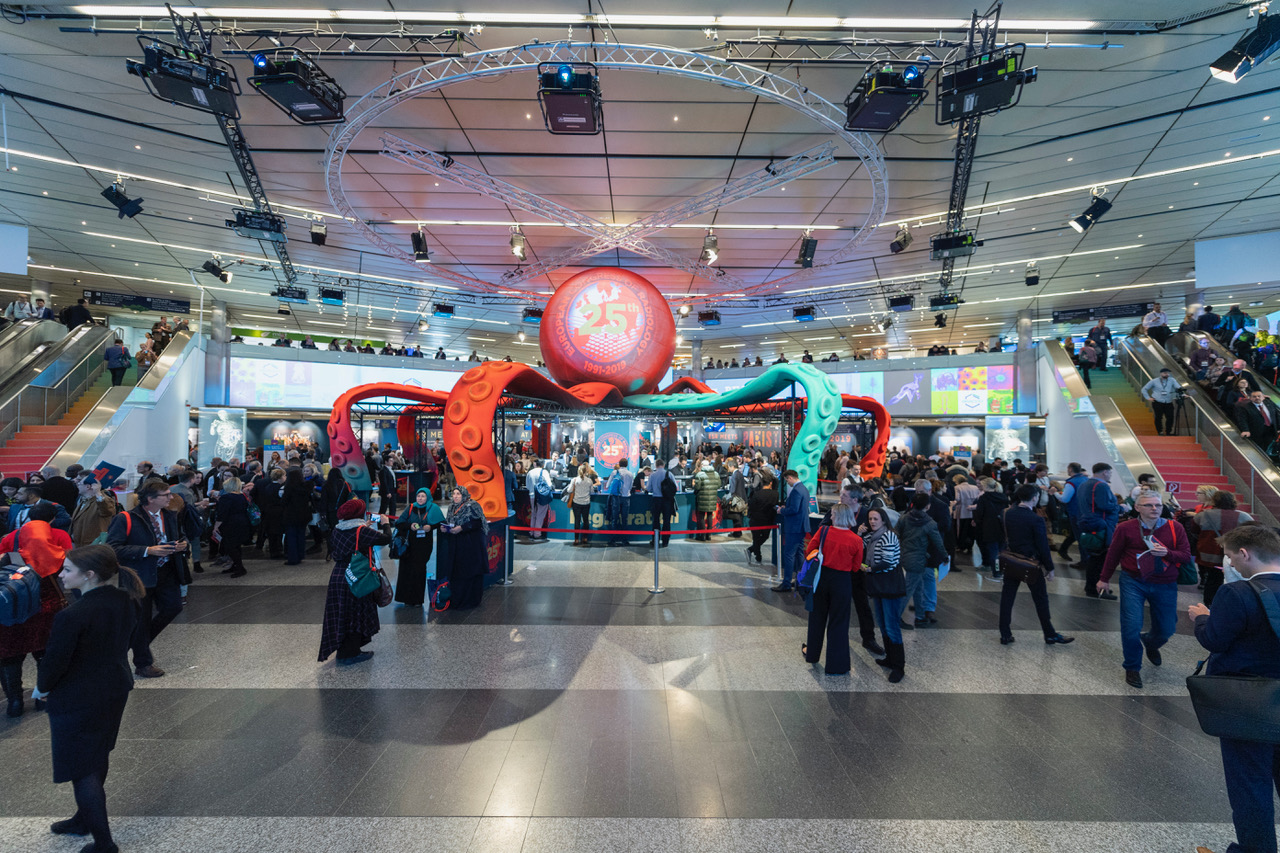
Entrance hall of the European Congress of Radiology 2019

The European Congress of Radiology (Europäischer Röntgenkongress) is an annual meeting in Europe for radiologists from around the world. Founded in 1967, the Congress is run by Verein Europäischer Röntgenkongress (ECR).

== History ==
When the congress was founded in 1967, it was held every four years in a different location. However, this format did not allow for the creation of a consistent group of experienced radiologists responsible for the preparation of the congress. Furthermore, the radiological community in Europe wanted to create a common platform for European radiologists.

In 1985, a committee chaired by Josef Lissner from Munich (Germany) was established to re-organise the Congress. The committee recommended holding the congress every two years in the same location, Vienna (Austria) . The society 'Verein Europäischer Röntgenkongress' (ECR) was founded, and a congress-organising institution was established at the Medical Academy of Vienna. The first 'new' Congress opened on Saturday, September 15, 1991 under the presidency of Lissner. It attracted more than 9,000 participants.

In 1999, the ECR changed the congress to an annual event.

== Description ==
The Congress is the largest radiological meeting in Europe with more than 28,000 participants from around 100 countries and 4,000 scientific papers and exhibits. To answer growing demand, the ECR has developed EPOS, an online electronic presentation system and ECR Online, providing coverage of the majority of sessions via live video streaming.
