= European Society of Radiology =

International medical society

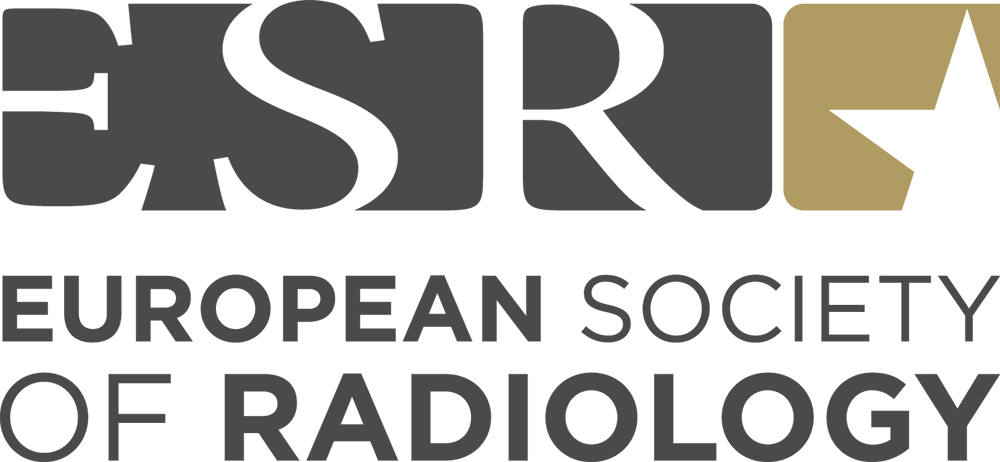
- Formation: 2005
- Type: Nonprofit organisation, scientific society
- Headquarters: House of European Radiology
- Location: Vienna, Austria
- Members: 149,167 people (2024)
- Official language: English
- Website: www.myesr.org

The European Society of Radiology (ESR) is an international medical society based in Vienna, Austria dedicated to the promotion and coordination of scientific, philanthropic, intellectual and professional activities of radiology in Europe. In addition to various other activities, the ESR serves as an umbrella organisation for European radiologists, organises the annual European Congress of Radiology (ECR) and coordinates the publication of European Radiology, a monthly peer-reviewed medical journal. Additionally, the ESR pilots the harmonisation of teaching programmes throughout Europe with various activities and initiatives.

== History ==
Founded in 2005, the European Society of Radiology (ESR) was created through the merger of two established radiological societies; the European Association of Radiology (EAR), a federation of national radiological societies founded in 1962, and the European Congress of Radiology (ECR), the organising body of the eponymous congress which was first held in 1967.

The EAR was established on 15 December 1962 through the efforts of Boris Rajewsky of the Max Planck Institute in Frankfurt and Charles Marie Gros of the University of Strasbourg who would become the association's first president and first secretary-general respectively. The EAR was tasked with coordinating a European congress and establishing a European counterpart to the Radiological Society of North America (RSNA), which had existed since 1915. By the time it was formally registered, the association comprised radiological member societies from nine countries – Belgium, France, Italy, Luxembourg, The Netherlands, Portugal, Spain, Switzerland, and West Germany. The European Congress of Radiology was to be held every four years in a different European city, starting in 1967 which Barcelona with took place in conjunction with the Radiological Federation of Latin Culture (Féderation Radiologique de Culture Latine).

After successor congresses were held in Amsterdam (1971), Edinburgh (1975), Hamburg (1979), Bordeaux (1983) and Lisbon (1987), the EAR in 1985 founded a committee, chaired by Josef Lissner of LMU Munich, specifically tasked with organising future congresses. An ever-changing location and the lack of a consistent group of experienced radiologists responsible for the congresses were deemed obstacles to the most effective congress possible. As a result, the committee ultimately decided that the frequency of the congress should be increased to every two years and a permanent host location be selected.

As the late 1980s, early 1990s was marked by the fall of the iron curtain and a call for greater European cooperation, a suitable host location was sought that could embody these ideals. Situated near the then border between eastern and western Europe, Vienna was chosen to host all future congresses beginning in 1991. By the late 1980s, the Verein Europaeischer Roentgenkongress, or European Congress of Radiology (ECR), had been founded and a congress-organising institution was established at the Medical University of Vienna, both in support of the biennial meeting. With ECR'91, EAR remained a federation of national societies who sent delegates to the general assembly at the end of every congress. Due to the growing success of the ECR, it was decided that the congress would be held annually from 1999 on.

By the beginning of the 2000s it had become clear to EAR leadership that a unified organisation combining all aspect of radiology including the ECR would better serve European radiology interests moving into the future. As the EAR had a federal structure with a restricted financial base, a new association would be necessary in order to create a unified "House of European Radiology" that could effectively combine the numerous and diverse responsibilities from the EAR and various congress planning organisations.

After more than three years of meetings and discussions, the General Assembly of EAR held in the Austria Center Vienna on 7 March 2005 unanimously approved of the statutes of the ESR, paving the way for the creation of the society as it functions today. Nicholas Gourtsoyiannis of the University of Crete, a guiding force behind the creation of the ESR and president of ECR 2003, served as its first president from December 2005 to March 2007.

=== House of European Radiology ===
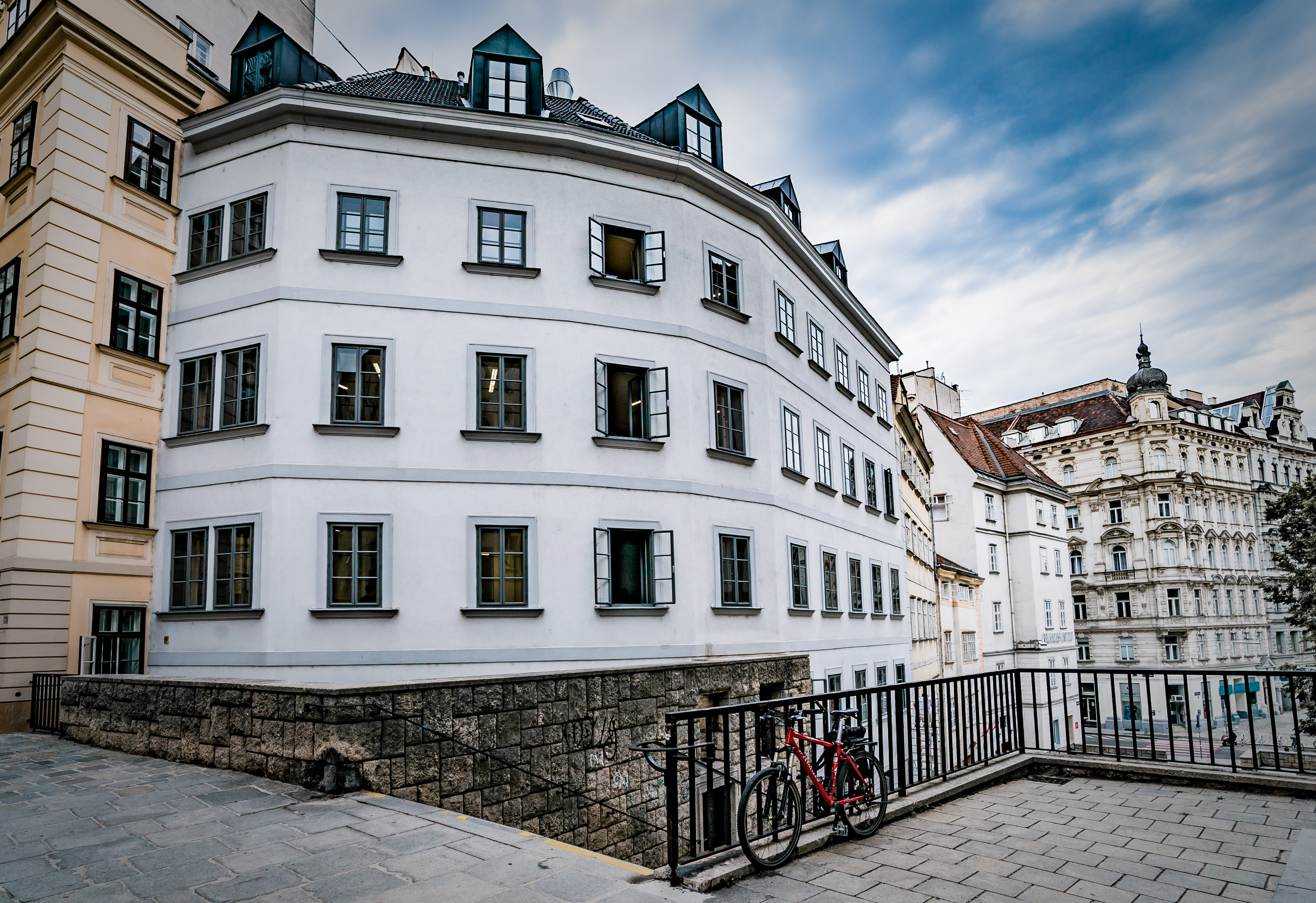
The facade of the ESR as seen from the Maria am Gestade church.

The House of European Radiology is the current headquarters of the European Society of Radiology (ESR) and has been since 2018 after the completion of its renovation. The building is located in the historic central district of Vienna, across from the steps leading to Maria am Gestade church on Am Gestade square. Through renovations, the building has retained the style of its facade dating from 1823 with a newly constructed interior which houses a majority of ESR functions.

== Structure ==
Upon the founding of the European Society of Radiology (ESR) in 2005, the board of directors, executive council and all executive bodies were integrated from the bodies of the two founding societies (EAR & ECR) to form the executive council through a process of voting.

The current structure of the ESR consists of a board of directors, committee chairs, the director of the European School of Radiology (ESOR) and the ESR executive director. These form the executive council which dictates and manages the various activities of the ESR. The composition of the board changes at the annual General Assembly which takes place on the last day of the European Congress of Radiology (ECR). The committee chairs and newest member of board of directors are elected by the voting members of the ESR.

The board of directors consists of the Past-President, Chairperson of the Board of Directors, President, 1st Vice-President and 2nd Vice-President. The 2nd Vice-President (the newest member of the board) is elected every year for a five year period of office, holding the position of 2nd Vice-President in the first year, 1st Vice-President in the second year, President in the third year, Chairperson of the Board of Directors in the fourth year and finally the Past-President in the fifth year of office. Re-election is not possible. The current chair of the ESR Board of Directors is Andrea Grace Rockall from London, United Kingdom.

== Membership ==
The European Society of Radiology (ESR) offers full membership to all European radiologists as well as professionals of allied sciences such as nuclear medicine physicians, radiographers, medical physicists, etc. Corresponding membership is offered to international radiologists and professionals of allied sciences. Membership is on a yearly basis and the ESR offers its members various benefits. These include:

- Reduced registration fees for the European Congress of Radiology (ECR).
- Free access to all contents of Education on Demand, the ESR e-learning platform, including the possibility to earn e-CME.
- Option to participate in:
  - European Diploma: examination based on the ESR European Training Curriculum (radiologists or radiology residents).
  - All activities of the European School of Radiology (ESOR).
- Use of EURORAD, a peer-reviewed online teaching database of radiology
- Electronic access to European Radiology, the monthly peer-reviewed medical journal.

Membership is also extended to various European and international societies of radiology as institutional and associate institutional members.

== Activities ==
=== European Congress of Radiology ===
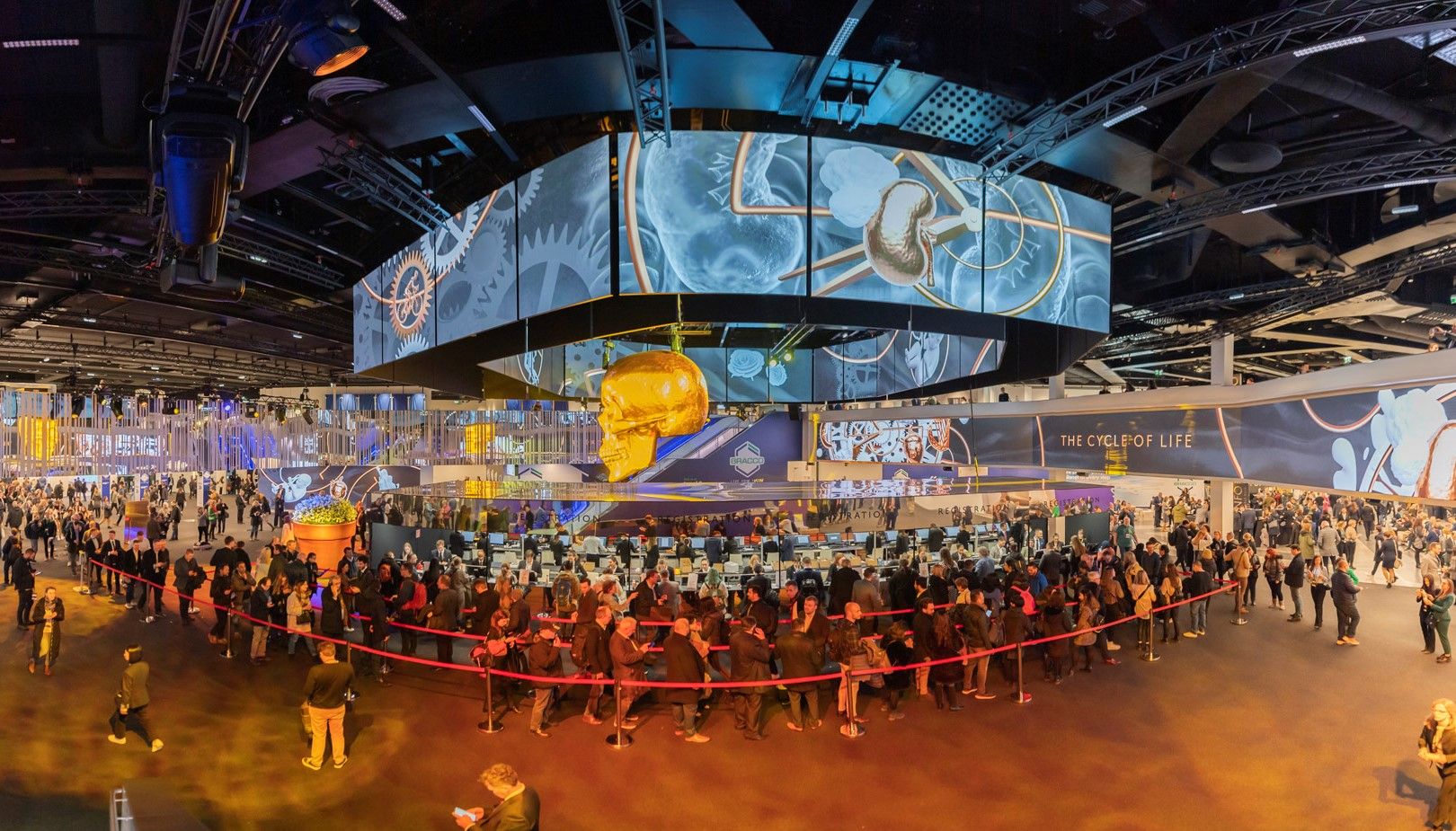
Entrance hall of ECR 2023

The core of the European Society of Radiology's (ESR) activities is the organisation of its annual meeting, the European Congress of Radiology (ECR). With more than 30,000 participants from around 120 countries, over 2,800 scientific presentations and 1,700 speakers, the ECR has developed into the largest radiological meeting in Europe since it was first held in its 'new' format in September 1991. It is held annually at the end of February or early March. Congress attendees include radiology professionals, professionals of allied sciences, industry representatives, and press reporters for both the medical and consumer press.

The ECR hosts an accompanying industrial exhibition over a space of 30,000 m^{2}, which provides a chance for congress-goers to explore state-of-the-art medical imaging technology and related services.

ECR is a hybrid meeting. Participants can choose to attend onsite or online, with all sessions being streamed live via ESR Connect.

=== International Day of Radiology ===
The International Day of Radiology is an annual event held with the aim of building greater awareness of the value that radiology contributes to safe patient care and improving understanding of the role radiologists and radiological technologists play in healthcare. It was launched in 2012 and is a joint initiative of the European Society of Radiology (ESR), the Radiological Society of North America (RSNA) and the American College of Radiology (ACR). November 8, the day that Wilhelm Conrad Röntgen discovered the existence of x-rays in 1895, was chosen as a day of action and awareness.

=== European Institute for Biomedical Imaging Research ===
The European Institute for Biomedical Imaging Research (EIBIR), established in 2006 on the initiative of the European Society of Radiology (ESR), aims to improve cooperation between research institutes, academic departments and industry that form the European biomedical imaging community with the goal of improving the diagnosis, treatment and prevention of diseases. It actively supports research networking activities and common initiatives and interoperability in the field of biomedical imaging research.

=== European and international affairs ===
The European Society of Radiology (ESR) undertakes various international and EU-level initiatives designed to support member interests internationally and in government. One of these initiatives is the ESR's collaborative work on cancer. Various cancer initiatives have been undertaken including collaboration with the European Joint Action on Cancer Control (CanCon JA). The ESR is part of the European Commission Initiative on Breast Cancer (ECIBC) whose aim is to develop new European Breast Guidelines, evidence-based recommendations for breast cancer screening and diagnosis and develop a voluntary European Breast QA scheme for breast cancer services.

Since 2012, the ESR has been a member of the EC's eHealth Stakeholder Group (eHSG), with the aim of recognising teleradiology as a medical act in its own right. Additionally, on 6 June 2018, the ESR organised an event at the European Parliament that brought together MEPs, EC officials, and health stakeholders to discuss the importance of effectively implementing health policies and legislation in clinical practice.

As a member of the EMA Healthcare Professionals Working Party (HCPWP), the ESR can be actively involved in activities of the EMA while also facilitating direct dialogue, having addressed topics such as gadolinium-based contrast agents and the implications of Brexit on radiology in Europe. The ESR also contributes to the Digital Imaging Adoption Model (DIAM) with the goal of supporting organisations in the planning and implementation of imaging IT in radiology departments.

== Publications ==
=== European Radiology ===
European Radiology, established in 1991, is a monthly peer-reviewed medical journal that features articles on a wide range of radiological topics. The flagship journal of the European Society of Radiology (ESR) seeks to update scientific knowledge in clinical radiology by publishing research articles of general interest as well as state-of-the-art reviews, and short communications written by leading radiologists. It is available to all members of the ESR and thus reaches a regular audience of over 100,000 readers, making it one of the most widely disseminated journals in the field of radiology. In 2021, the journal had an impact factor (IF) of 7.034.

The Editorial Board currently consists of 169 board members and over 3,000 active reviewers, racking up more than 2,000,000 downloads. European Radiology's Editor-in-Chief is Yves Menu, chairman of the department of radiology at Saint Antoine Hospital, Pierre & Marie Curie University in Paris, France.

=== European Radiology Experimental ===
European Radiology Experimental, the youngest of the ESR journal family, is an open access scientific medical journal that focuses on modern multidisciplinary research involving radiology in the experimental setting and basic science. The journal publishes articles on a wide range of topics including new modalities/techniques (e.g., magnetic resonance sequences or spectral computed tomography applications, molecular, hybrid, and optical imaging), 3D-modelling, printing and advanced teleradiology (e.g., virtual physician-patient interaction).

The current Editor-in-Chief is Francesco Sardanelli of the University of Milan. The Editorial Board currently consists of 72 members and the journal saw almost 300,000 downloads in 2022.

=== Insights into Imaging ===
Insights into Imaging is an open access journal with a focus on critical reviews, guidelines and policy statements, and is dedicated to education and strategies in radiology. The current Editor-in-Chief is Paola Clauser of the Medical University of Vienna. The journal, which consists of 82 Editorial Board members and had over 3,600,000 downloads in 2022, currently holds an impact factor of 5.036 and ranks 29 of 136 in the journal category "Radiology, Nuclear Medicine and Medical Imaging".

== Education ==
=== European School of Radiology ===
The European School of Radiology (ESOR) is an institution fulfilling the mission of the European Society of Radiology (ESR) in the field of education. One of its main goals is to harmonise radiological education in Europe. It offers various programmes including fellowships, visiting professorships and courses. Additionally, ESOR also provides an e-learning platform and continuing medical education (CME) credits for its courses.

=== European Board of Radiology ===
The European Board of Radiology (EBR) is an organisation whose purpose is to investigate, develop and implement certification and accreditation activities and programmes in radiology. Some of its activities include:

- The European Diploma in Radiology (EDiR): Officially endorsed by the European Union of Medical Specialists (UEMS) and the ESR, EDiR provides standardisation and accreditation for radiologists across European borders.
- The European Training Assessment Programme (ETAP 2.0): ETAP 2.0 is an assessment of training institutions in radiology. The developed guidelines and standards are assessed by visiting experts who then provide the institution with a certificate of excellence.
- The Accreditation Council in Imaging (ACI): The ACI was established to cooperate with the accreditation council of the European Union of Medical Specialists (UEMS), the European Accreditation Council for Continuing Medical Education (EACCME), and its Radiology Section in harmonising [Continuing Medical Education] accreditation.

=== Eurorad ===
Eurorad is an online radiological case database that has been freely available since 2009. Radiologists are able to submit cases which are then reviewed before being published on the site. The database's origins can be found in the late 1990s when the Europeans Association of Radiology (EAR) realized a comprehensive approach to case studies that could parallel their peer-reviewed journals would be necessary. Today the portal is an open resource to radiologists and researchers.

=== Education on Demand ===
Education on Demand is the ESR's premium e-learning platform. The platform offers hundreds of video, presentation and literature-based courses for radiologists. With Education on Demand Premium users can access a higher number of courses and can also obtain Continuing Medical Education (CME) credits.

=== ESR Connect ===
ESR Connect is the ESR's on-demand video platform. On ESR Connect, users can participate in live courses and watch recorded sessions and lectures from previous ECRs. The platform offers on-demand access to more than 2,400 hours of on-demand educational video content with both free and subscription-based content.

=== Eurosafe Imaging ===
EuroSafe Imaging is the ESR's initiative to promote appropriateness in medical imaging. Officially launched at the European Congress of Radiology in March 2014, the initiative is meant to address radiation protection in patients. Newsletters, sessions in conferences and training material are generated for the goal of informing physicians on best practice.
