= Radiological Society of North America =

Organization of medical imaging professionals

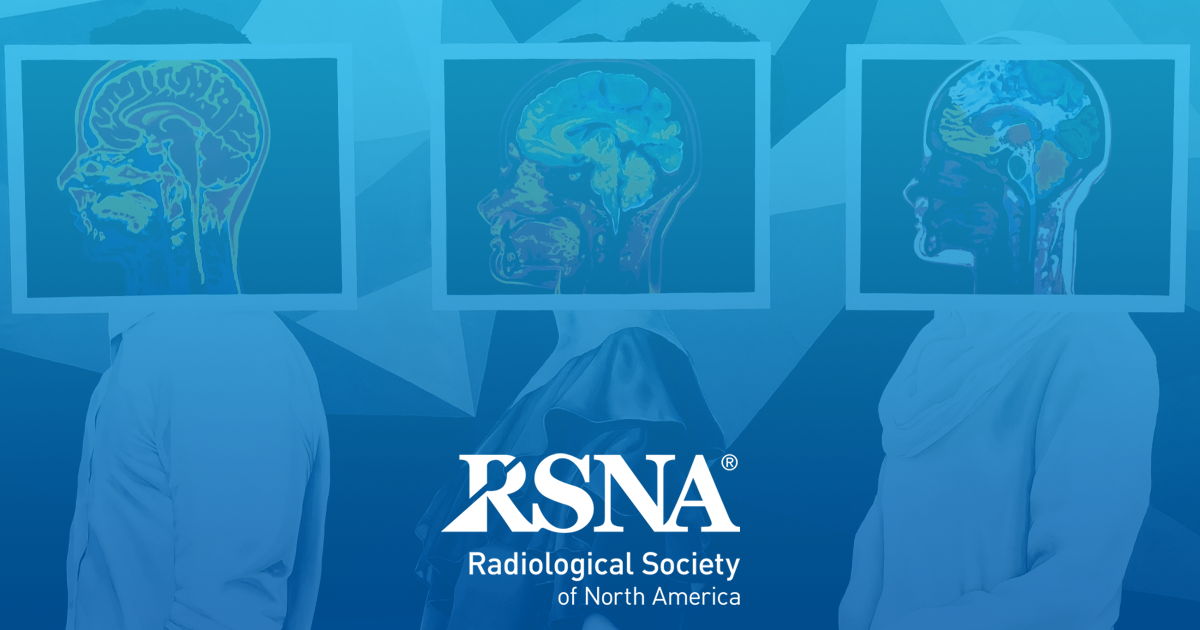
Radiological Society of North America (RSNA)

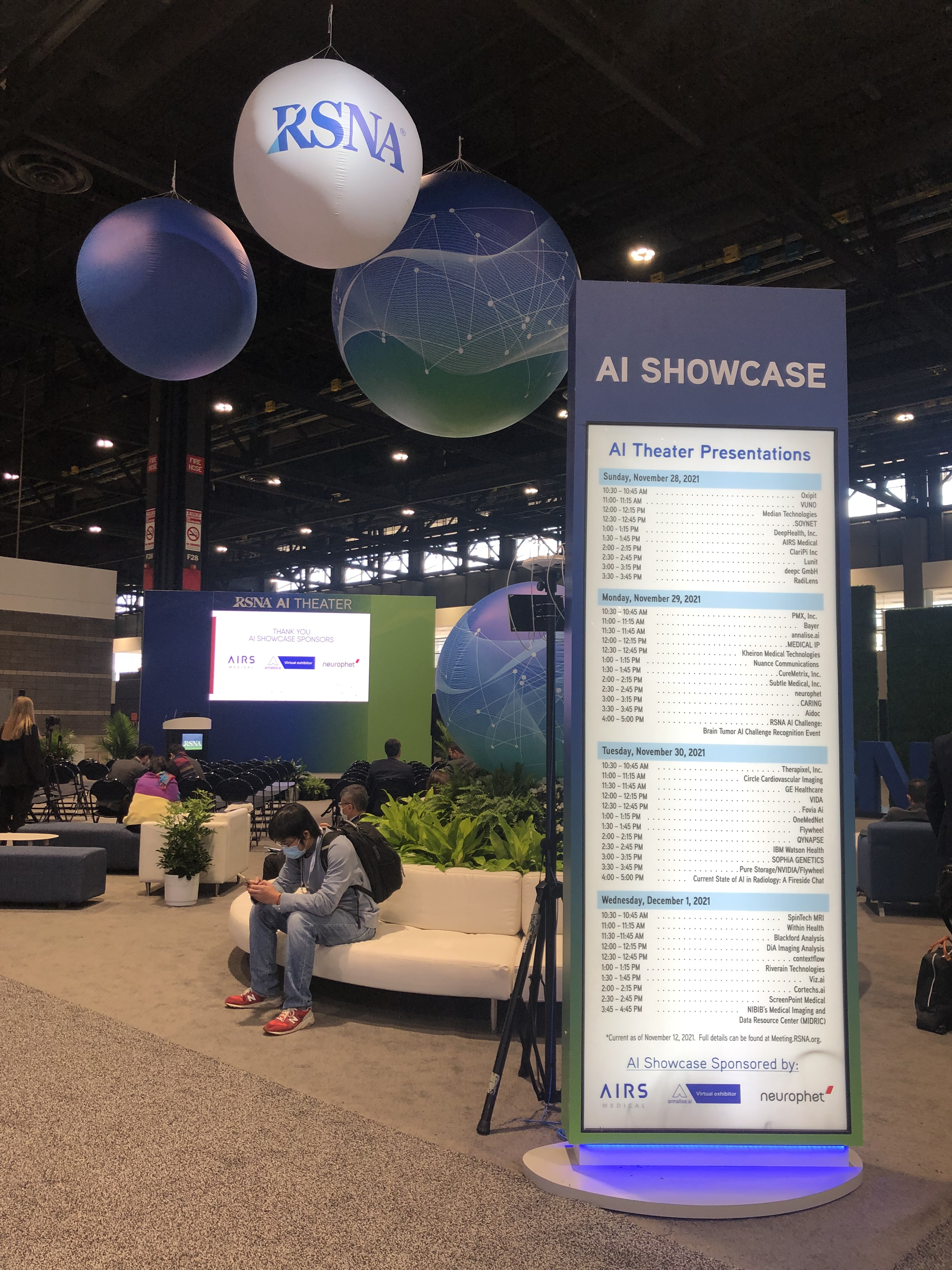
RSNA 2021 AI Showcase at McCormick Place in Chicago

The Radiological Society of North America (RSNA) is a non-profit organization and an international society of radiologists, medical physicists and other medical imaging professionals. Based in Oak Brook, Illinois, it was established in 1915.

The Society hosts an annual conference in Chicago and develops educational resources about radiology such as courses, workshops and webinars. RSNA also publishes six peer-reviewed radiology journals, offers quality improvement tools, sponsors research to advance quantitative imaging biomarkers, and conducts outreach to enhance radiology education and patient care in low-income and middle-income countries.

== Annual meeting ==
RSNA hosts the world's largest annual medical imaging conference, a five-day event starting the last Sunday of November at the McCormick Place convention center in Chicago.

== Journals ==
RSNA publishes six peer-reviewed journals: Radiology, offering radiology research and reviews; RadioGraphics, dedicated to continuing education in radiology; Radiology: Artificial Intelligence, highlights the emerging applications of machine learning and artificial intelligence in the field of imaging across multiple disciplines; Radiology: Cardiothoracic Imaging, emphasizes research advances and technical developments in medical imaging that drive cardiothoracic medicine; Radiology: Imaging Cancer, covers the best clinical and translational cancer imaging studies across organ systems and modalities, including leading-edge technological developments; Radiology Advances, an open access journal focusing on the publication of a broad spectrum of high-quality international radiology and medical imaging research.

== Case Collection ==
RSNA Case Collection is an online resource of clinical cases intended to be used as an educational tool. RSNA Case Collection includes image-focused case reports from across radiology subspecialties.

== RadiologyInfo.org ==
Available in English and Spanish, RadiologyInfo.org is a public information website developed and funded by RSNA and the American College of Radiology. It was established to inform and educate the general public about what radiology is and what radiologists do. Approximately half a million people visit RadiologyInfo.org each month.

== Research and Education Foundation ==
The RSNA R&E Foundation supports radiology research through grant funding, training opportunities and industry initiatives that advance innovation in radiology. The Foundation has awarded $84 million in grants since 1984.

== Board of Directors ==
Jeffrey Klein, MD, is the 2025-2026 president of RSNA's Board of Directors.

== See also ==
- International Day of Radiology
