= Slavik Tabakov =

- Education: Technical University, Sofia
- Known for: Work in e-learning in medical physics
- Scientific career
- Fields: Medical Physics
- Workplaces: IOMP, King's College London

Slavik Tabakov (Bulgarian: Славик Табаков) is a British-Bulgarian medical physicist, President of the International Organization for Medical Physics (IOMP) 2015-2018 and Vice-President of the International Union for Physical and Engineering Sciences in Medicine (IUPESM) 2018-2021. He has made significant contributions to the development and global dissemination of medical physics education and training and has pioneered e-learning in the profession.

== Biography ==
Slavik Tabakov was born in Plovdiv, Bulgaria to a family of medical doctors. He gained a college education in Plovdiv and left with a Distinction from the Technical University, Sofia. In 1981 he took an academic position at the Plovdiv Medical University.

In 1991 he joined the Department of Medical Engineering and Physics, King's College Hospital. Since 2001 he has been the Director of the MSc programmes in King’s College London: MSc Medical Engineering and Physics and MSc Clinical Sciences. From 2002 he has acted as Co-Director of the International College on Medical Physics at the International Centre for Theoretical Physics (ICTP) Trieste, Italy.

Slavik Tabakov has been involved in international teams of specialists in pioneering the concepts of e-learning in medical physics since 1993. In August 2006, at a ceremony during the World Congress in Seoul, South Korea, he was granted the IOMP Harold Johns Medal for Excellence in Teaching and International Education Leadership.

In 2012 he was nominally elected as President of the International Organization for Medical Physics (IOMP), a position he held on to in 2015.

== Medical physics international e-learning activities ==
In 1994, Slavik Tabakov coordinated and worked among a consortium of academics from universities and hospitals including King’s College London, Lund University, University of Florence, Portuguese Oncology Institute, International Centre for Theoretical Physics, Trinity College, Dublin and Plovdiv Medical University, in developing the project EMERALD. The project created the first e-learning material in medical physics in 1997. In 1999 the team developed and introduced the first educational web site in medical physics and developed the e-learning project EMIT. In 2004 these e-learning materials received the inaugural award for vocational education of the European Union (EU) – The Leonardo da Vinci Award.

Slavik Tabakov has also been advisor to universities and hospitals in Eastern Europe, Asia and Latin America, helping to establish new MSc programmes in Medical Physics in the countries. He charted the development of these processes in the book "The Pioneering of e-Learning in Medical Physics".

In the period 2005-2010 he led the largest international project in medical physics, Project EMITEL. The project included 300 experts from 36 countries and developed the first Multilingual Dictionary of Medical Physics and e-Encyclopaedia of Medical Physics. To date, the Dictionary has been translated in 29 languages.

Slavik Tabakov is a member of the IOMP Executive Committee since 2000, and member of the Administrative Council of the International Union for Physical and Engineering Sciences in Medicine (IUPESM) since 2009. He is a member of the Editorial Boards of: the Journal “Health and Technology”, Springer and the CRC Press Book Series “Series in Medical Physics and Biomedical Engineering”. In 2013 he became the Founding Co-Editor (together with Perry Sprawls) of the IOMP e-Journal “Medical Physics International”.

== Professional achievements, Awards and Honours ==
Slavik Tabakov holds numerous international Honorary and Visiting Academic positions (Professor and Reader). He is Fellow of: the UK Institute of Physics and Engineering in Medicine (1998); the UK Higher Education Academy (2007), the International Organization for Medical Physics (2013). He has been awarded with the EU Leonardo da Vinci Award (2004) and the IOMP Harold Johns Medal (2006), and has also received Honorary Medals and Diplomas from: the Bulgarian Society of Biomedical Physics and Engineering (1996), the Lithuanian University of Technology, Kaunas (2000), the Thai Medical Physics Society (2002), the Middle East Federation of Organisations for Medical Physics (2013). He has also received the King’s College London Teaching Excellence Award (2009), the MPEC Presidential Prize of IPEM, UK (2015), and the Honorary Membership of the Association of Medical Physicists in India (2015). The Plovdiv Medical University bestowed upon him their highest honour - Doctor Honoris Causa degree in 2015.

== Personal life ==
Slavik Tabakov is married to Dr Vassilka Tabakova. They live in London, UK and have one daughter, composer Dobrinka Tabakova.
