= Azam Niroomand-Rad =

Medical physicist

- اعظم نیرومند راد
- Born: 1947 (age 78–79); Tehran, Iran
- Citizenship: United States
- Alma mater: State University of New York at Albany (BS); Michigan State University (PhD)
- Known for: First woman president of the International Organization for Medical Physics; founding the AAPM/IOMP International Scientific Exchange Programs
- Awards: AAPM Edith H. Quimby Lifetime Achievement Award (2006); IOMP Marie Skłodowska-Curie Award (2009)
- Scientific career
- Fields: Medical physics, radiation oncology physics, radiation dosimetry
- Workplaces: Georgetown University Medical Center; University of Wisconsin–Madison

Azam Niroomand-Rad (Persian: اعظم نیرومند راد; born 1947) is an Iranian-American medical physicist specializing in radiation oncology physics and radiation dosimetry. She is professor emerita of radiation medicine at Georgetown University Medical Center and an honorary professor of medical physics at the University of Wisconsin–Madison. From 2003 to 2006 she was president of the International Organization for Medical Physics (IOMP), the first woman to hold the post.

== Early life and education ==
Niroomand-Rad was born in Tehran, Iran, in 1947. She moved to the United States as a Fulbright scholarship student and earned a Bachelor of Science in mathematics, summa cum laude, from the State University of New York at Albany in 1970. She received a PhD in atomic and molecular physics from Michigan State University in 1978, and then trained in medical physics at the University of Wisconsin–Madison.

== Career ==
Niroomand-Rad worked as a clinical radiation oncology physicist and academic at Georgetown University Medical Center in Washington, D.C., where she served as clinical physics director in the Department of Radiation Medicine. She later became an honorary professor of medical physics at the University of Wisconsin–Madison.

She was vice-president of the IOMP before serving as its president from 2003 to 2006. She founded the AAPM/IOMP International Scientific Exchange Programs (ISEP), which ran training courses in medical physics for developing countries; the first was held in Islamabad, Pakistan, in 1992, and later courses took place in Asia, Africa, and the Middle East. She also co-directed the first Cuba–USA International Conference on Medical Physics. According to the IOMP, her work in its leadership included seeking recognition of medical physics as a profession by the International Labour Organization and establishing IOMP awards. In 2003 she took part in an International Atomic Energy Agency expert activity in Amman, Jordan.

She edited the IOMP bulletin Medical Physics World from 1994 to 2000 and was an associate editor of the journal Medical Physics. Within the American Association of Physicists in Medicine (AAPM) she served on committees and task groups, including Task Group 235, and in 1998 she presented the results of an AAPM survey of women in medical physics.

== Research ==
Her research has covered electron beam dosimetry, including total skin electron irradiation, calibration of high-energy photon and electron beams, and radiochromic film dosimetry. She was first author of the report of AAPM Task Group 235, which updated the earlier TG-55 recommendations on radiochromic film dosimetry. She has also written on the history of medical physics education in Iran.

She is a co-inventor of U.S. Patent 6,665,555, granted in 2003 and assigned to Georgetown University, for a method of delivering stereotactic radiosurgery to lesions of the spine.

== Awards and honors ==
- Fellow of the American Association of Physicists in Medicine (1997)
- Teacher of the Year Award, Association of Residents in Radiation Oncology
- Edith H. Quimby Lifetime Achievement Award, AAPM (2006)
- Marie Skłodowska-Curie Award, IOMP (2009)
- Award of Achievement in Medical Physics, Mid-Atlantic Chapter of the AAPM
- Fellow of the IOMP and of the International Union for Physical and Engineering Sciences in Medicine
