= Clive Baldock =

British-born Australian professor

Clive Baldock PhD DFACPSEM FAIP FIPEM FInstP FRSN
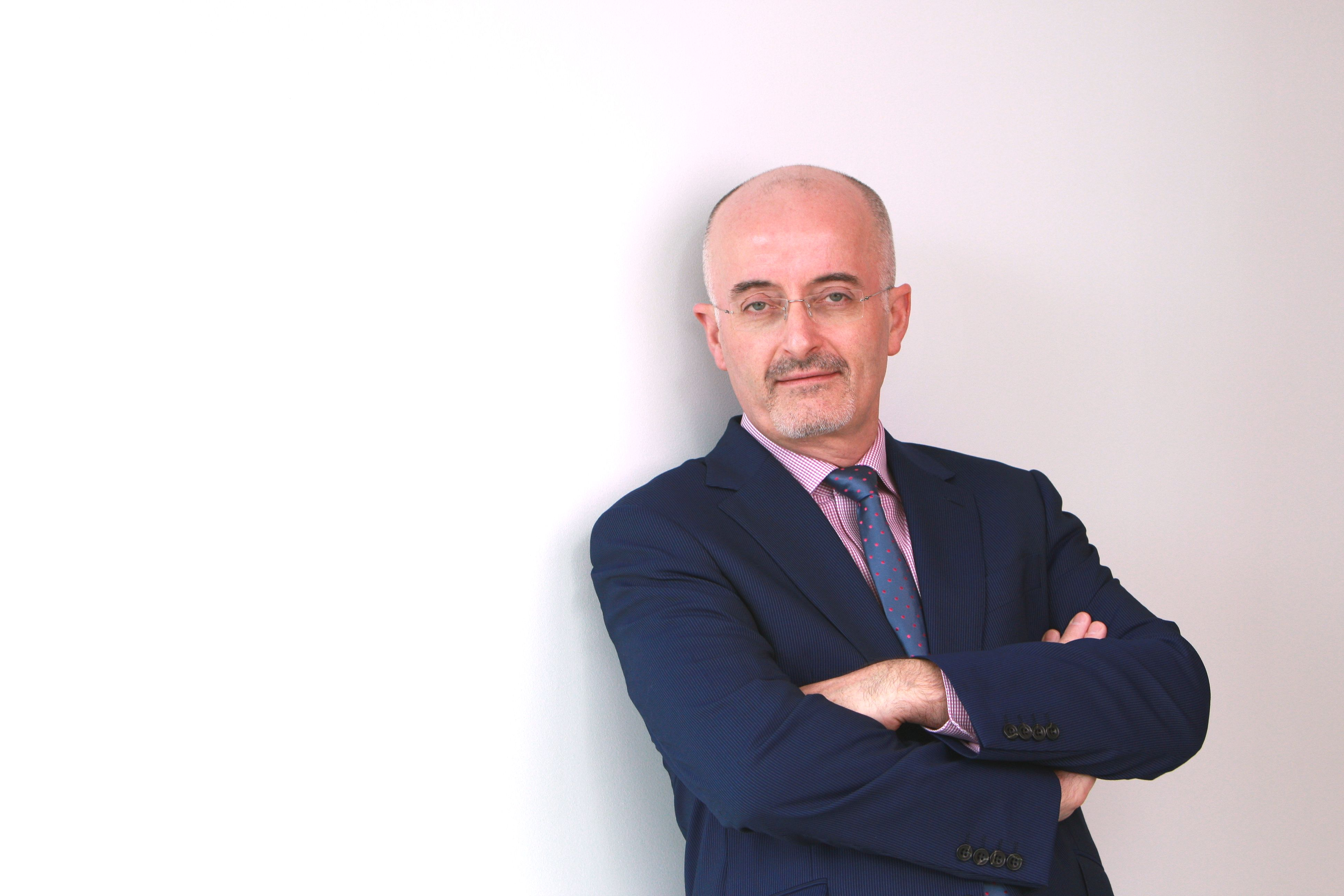
- Born: Rochford, UK
- Education: University of Oxford; University of Melbourne; King's College London; University of London; University of Sussex
- Known for: Medical Physics

Clive Baldock is a British-born Australian professor. He graduated with a BSc (hons) in Physics from the University of Sussex, an MSc in Radiation Physics from St Bartholomew's Hospital Medical College, University of London, a PhD in Medical Physics from King's College London, a master's of Tertiary Education Management from the University of Melbourne. In addition to being awarded a Postgraduate Certificate in Historical Studies from the University of Oxford, he also completed the University of Oxford Saïd Business School Executive Leadership Programme.

Clive Baldock is an honorary professor at the University of Wollongong. His previous roles in Australia have included Head of the School of Physics at the University of Sydney, Executive Dean of Science at Macquarie University, Executive Director for Physical Sciences, Engineering, Mathematics and Information Sciences at the Australian Research Council (ARC), Dean of Graduate Research and Pro Vice-Chancellor for Researcher Development at the University of Tasmania, Dean of Graduate Research at the University of Wollongong, and Dean of Graduate Studies and Researcher Development at Western Sydney University.

Clive Baldock’s research interests are in the fields of gel dosimetry, radiation therapy, dosimetry, and medical imaging in which he has published over 170 research journal papers. He has been awarded Fellowships of the Royal Society of New South Wales, the Australian Institute of Physics, the Australasian College of Physical Scientists and Engineers in Medicine (Distinguished), the Institute of Physics (UK) and the Institute of Physics and Engineering in Medicine (UK). In 2024 he served as the president of the Australian Council of Graduate Research (ACGR), the university sector peak body for graduate research in Australia having previously served as secretary and treasurer of the Australian Council of Deans of Science (ACDS). He is Editor-in-Chief of the journal, Physical and Engineering Sciences in Medicine.
