= Ghana Society for Medical Physics =

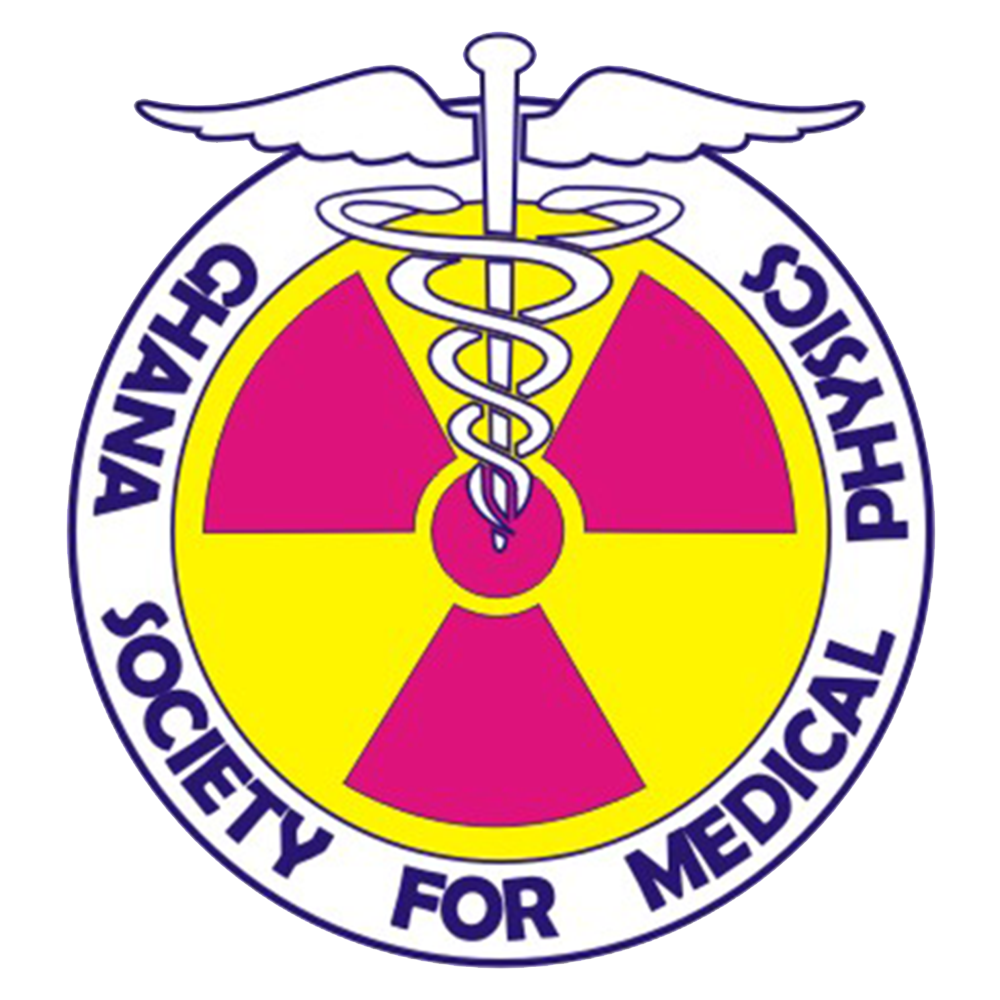
- Logo of Ghana Society for Medical Physics
- Abbreviation: GSMP
- Established: January 14, 2011; 15 years ago
- Type: Non-profit Organization
- Legal status: Active
- Purpose: To represent and unite all Medical Physicists in Ghana, and to regulate and guide activities of clinical Medical Physicists.
- Headquarters: Medical Physics Department, School of Nuclear and Allied Science, University of Ghana, Legon-Ghana
- Location: Ghana
- Coordinates: 5.667°N 0.23°W
- Official language: English
- Secretary General: Dr. Shirazu Issahaku
- President: Dr. Eric K. Addison
- Vice President: Prof. Francis Hasford
- Treasurer: Francis Doughan
- Organizing Secretary: Michael Nyamadi
- Key people: Deputy General Secretary: Dr. Theresa Bebaaku Dery; Deputy Treasurer: Dr. Mark Pokoo-Aikins
- Website: www.gsmpghana.org

The Ghana Society for Medical Physics is Ghana's representative body for all medical physicists in the country. The organization's purpose is to unite and support its members in Ghana. It was set up in January 2011 to advance the use of principles of physics in medicine. The Society is the governing body for all medical physicists in Ghana, and contributes to their training.

The Society operates under a constitution, code of ethics, and Practice Standards. All its operations are subject to the Ghana Health Professions Regulatory Bodies Act 857 of 2013. The organization carries out research in the areas of radiation therapy, medical imaging and nuclear medicine, and collaborates with other organizations to host seminars and training courses. The Ghana Society for Medical Physics is Ghana's national representative to the Federation of African Medical Physics Organizations (FAMPO), and represents the International Organization for Medical Physics (IOMP) in Ghana.

The Society's headquarters is in Accra, at the Medical Physics Department of the School of Nuclear and Allied Sciences of the University of Ghana.

== Affiliations ==
- International Organization for Medical Physics (IOMP)
- Federation of African Medical Physics Organizations (FAMPO)
- International Atomic Energy Agency (IAEA)
- Allied Health Professional Council of Ghana (AHPC)

== Past presidents of GSMP ==
- Professor John Humphery Amuasi (2011 - 2017)
