= Madan M. Rehani =

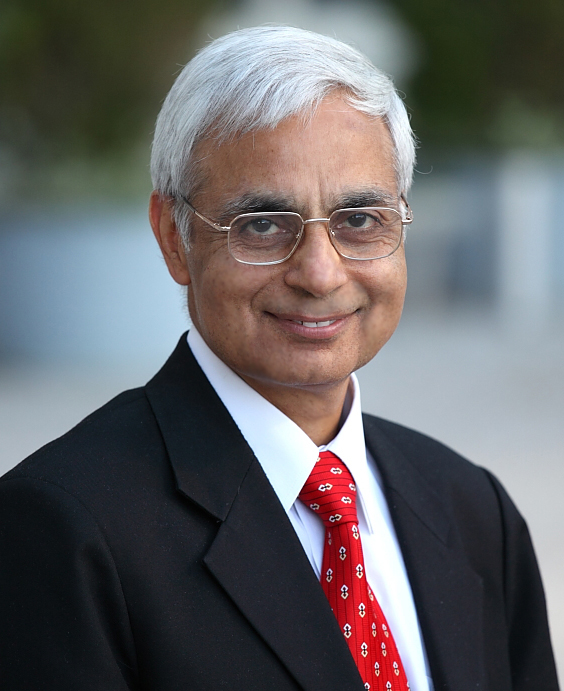
- Education: All India Institute of Medical Sciences (Ph.D.)
- Known for: Patient and staff radiation protection, patient exposure tracking (in CT, fluoroscopy, PET/CT), radiation and cataract, training of cardiologists and doctors using fluoroscopy
- Scientific career
- Fields: Medical Physics, Medical Imaging, and Radiation Protection
- Workplaces: International Atomic Energy Agency, Massachusetts General Hospital, Harvard Medical School

Madan M. Rehani is an Indian-born American medical physicist.

== Employment and voluntary positions ==
Madan Rehani is currently director of global outreach for radiation protection at the Massachusetts General Hospital, Professor of Radiology at Harvard Medical School, Boston, MA, US, and an adjunct professor at the Duke University Medical Center, Durham, NC, US. He worked earlier for over 11 years at the International Atomic Energy Agency (IAEA), Vienna, Austria. He was professor and head of medical physics at the All India Institute of Medical Sciences (AIIMS), New Delhi, India, before joining the IAEA in 2001. He was also head of the World Health Organization's (WHO) Collaborating Centre on Imaging Technology & Radiation Protection, which he established in 1997. He was president (2018-2021) of the International Organization for Medical Physics (IOMP) and is the current president of the International Union for Physical and Engineering Sciences in Medicine (2022-2025). He is an emeritus member of the International Commission on Radiological Protection (ICRP) for life after having been a regular member from 1997 to 2021. Under his chairmanship, 4 Annals of the ICRP were published, and another 4 with him as a member of the Task Group. He is senior editor of The British Journal of Radiology, associate editor of European Journal of Medical Physics, was associate editor of Medical Physics and was assistant editor of American Journal of Roentgenology for several years.

== Work on Radiation Protection ==
Rehani is well known for his contributions in patient radiation doses, cumulative doses, and patient radiation protection. He has directed and supervised projects in over 70 countries and published more than 60 multinational papers. He established the International Atomic Energy Agency's (IAEA) website on radiation protection of patients; the smart card project for tracking radiation exposures of patients; research on radiation-induced cataract in the eyes of interventional cardiologists and support staff; research on radiation safety of children in developing countries; development of training material on radiation protection; and training of doctors using fluoroscopy outside radiology (cardiologists, urologists, orthopedic surgeons, vascular surgeons, gastroenterologist, and gynecologists) from over 60 countries. He also set up the EuroSafe Imaging program by the European Society of Radiology. He has developed a new concept on "acceptable quality dose (AQD)" to take into account limitations of diagnostic reference levels (DRLs), which have been used as an index in radiation protection for nearly three decades. He was Chair of the Program Committee of the IAEA International Conference on Radiation Protection in Medicine.

== Honors and awards ==
During his tenure at the IAEA, a certificate was awarded to Madan Rehani to commemorate the 2005 Nobel Peace Prize, which was jointly awarded to the Head of the IAEA and to the IAEA. Staff members whose work was included in the citation (e.g. "safe use of radiation" in the case of Rehani), were awarded a certificate with a copy of the original prize; the prize money was donated to a cancer fund charity.

Rehani was chosen among 50 medical physicists who have made outstanding contributions in the world over the last 50 years (1963–2013) and honored at the International Conference on Medical Physics in Brighton, UK on 1–4 September 2013. He received the 2015 Butterfly Award from the Alliance for Radiation Safety in Pediatric Imaging.

He was elected as Fellow of the International Organization for Medical Physics (IOMP) in 2013, and awarded Honorary Membership of the Society for Pediatric Radiology in May 2011, the Dr. N.C. Singhal Oration by the Association of Medical Physicists of India (Northern Chapter) in April 2011, the Harold Johns Medal by the International Organization for Medical Physics (IOMP) in 2009, the Dr. K.M. Rai Oration by the Indian Radiological & Imaging Association in 2001, and the Homi Bhabha Memorial Oration by the Society of Nuclear Medicine India in 1999.

Rehani was president of the Association of Medical Physicists of India (UPDEL Chapter) from 1990 to 1994, president of the Society of Nuclear Medicine, India in 2001, Fellow of the Indian College of Nuclear Medicine, and secretary of the College from 1997-2001.

== Publications ==
He has edited 5 books, is responsible for 15 IAEA publications, 8 Annals of ICRP, and published more than 200 papers in peer reviewed journals. An exhaustive publication list can be found on PubMed or Rehani's Google Scholar page.

== Media coverage ==
- Concerns emerge about EU radiation safety directive - AuntMinnieEurope
- YouTube videos weigh threat of CT radiation exposure - DiagnosticImaging
- IAEA Calls for Enhanced Radiation Protection of Patients - CNN
- Cataract Risk Points to Need for Better Safety Measures - RSNA
- ESR's EuroSafe Imaging campaign promotes radiation protection
- RPOP celebrates sending the 100th update to its subscribers
