= Journal of Applied Clinical Medical Physics =

Academic journal

JACMP journal cover, March 2024, volume 25, issue 3

The Journal of Applied Clinical Medical Physics (JACMP) is a monthly peer-reviewed scientific journal covering research on applied clinical medical physics. It was established in 2000 as one of the first gold Open Access journals in the field. JACMP is one of two official journals of the American Association of Physicists in Medicine (AAPM), the other being Medical Physics. JACMP is similar in scope to Medical Physics, but has a clinical emphasis.

The editor-in-chief is Michael D Mills (University of Louisville).

JACMP and Medical Physics have SCImago Journal Rank indicators (H-Indices) of 59 and 208, respectively.
