= Physical and Engineering Sciences in Medicine =

- Discipline: Medical physics
- Language: English
- Edited by: Clive Baldock

Publication details
- Former names: Australasian Physical & Engineering Sciences in Medicine
- History: 1977–present
- Publisher: Springer Science+Business Media
- Frequency: Quarterly
- Open access: Hybrid
- Impact factor: 2.4 (2025)

Standard abbreviations
- ISO 4: Phys. Eng. Sci. Med.

Indexing
- CODEN: AUPMDI
- ISSN: 0158-9938 (print); 1879-5447 (web)
- OCLC no.: 60622736

Links
- Journal homepage; Online archive

Physical and Engineering Sciences in Medicine is a quarterly peer-reviewed medical journal covering research in medical physics and biomedical engineering. It is the official journal of the Australasian College of Physical Scientists and Engineers in Medicine and is recognized as an official journal of the International Organization for Medical Physics, Asia-Oceania Federation of Organizations for Medical Physics and the Biomedical College of Engineers Australia.

The journal was first published from 1977 to 1979 as Australasian Physical Sciences in Medicine, and from 1980 to 2019 as Australasian Physical & Engineering Sciences in Medicine, obtaining its current name in 2020. It has been published by Springer Science+Business Media since 2010. The journal replaced the earlier Australasian Bulletin of Medical Physics and Australasian Newsletter of Medical Physics, which were established in 1966 and 1959, respectively.

ACPSEM awards the Kenneth Clarke Award annually for the best original paper published by an ACPSEM member in the journal in the previous year.

== Abstracting and indexing ==
The journal is abstracted and indexed in:

- Chemical Abstracts Service
- Index Medicus/MEDLINE/PubMed
- Scopus
