= John Alexander Hopps =

Canadian medical researcher (1919–1998)

- Born: May 21, 1919; Winnipeg, Manitoba, Canada
- Died: November 24, 1998 (aged 79)
- Education: University of Manitoba (B.Sc.Eng.)
- Occupation: medical researcher
- Known for: pioneering cardiac pacemaker
- Awards: Order of Canada

John Alexander Hopps, OC (May 21, 1919 – November 24, 1998) was a Canadian medical researcher. He was co-developer of both the first artificial pacemaker and the first combined pacemaker-defibrillator, and was the founder of the Canadian Medical and Biological Engineering Society (CMBES). He has been called the "Father of biomedical engineering in Canada."

He was also the President and Secretary-General of the International Federation for Medical and Biological Engineering from the 1970s to the mid-1980s. He is a member of the Canadian Science and Engineering Hall of Fame.

== Life and work ==
Born in Winnipeg, Manitoba, he received a B.Sc.Engineering degree in electrical engineering from the University of Manitoba in 1941. He joined the National Research Council of Canada (NRC) in 1942.

In the early 1940s, Hopps was very focused on researching how to pasteurize beer using various waves like radio waves or microwaves. Beginning in 1949, he worked with Doctors Wilfred Bigelow and John Callaghan at the Banting Institute in the University of Toronto, developing the world's first external artificial pacemaker in 1951. (The first internal pacemaker was implanted in a human body by a Swedish team in 1958.) Hopps initially resented his work at the institute, calling it "an annoying interruption." During this work, Hopps discovered that the heart would contract when subjected to electrical impulses.

Hopps was an advisor to the Sri Lanka health department's Electromedical Division through the Canadian government's Colombo Plan in 1957-58 before returning to the NRC and becoming head of its Medical Engineering Section in 1973.

In 1965, Hopps founded the Canadian Medical and Biological Engineering Society (CMBES) and became its first President. In 1971, he was appointed president of the International Federation for Medical and Biological Engineering, for which he later served as the secretary general from 1976 to 1985. In 1976, he was awarded the honour of Fellow of the CMBES. He was also the President of the Ontario Heart Foundation's Ottawa Chapter.

He retired in 1978. In 1985, his autobiography, Passing Pulses, the Pacemaker and Medical Engineering: A Canadian Story, was published. The same year, he also won the A.G.L. McNaughton Award for engineering contributions made as a Canadian.

In 1986, he was made an Officer of the Order of Canada.
