= Åke Öberg =

Swedish professor of biomedical engineering

Per "Åke" Öberg, born 1937 in Härnösand, is a Professor of Biomedical Engineering at Linköping University, Sweden.

Öberg received his M.S. in Electrical Engineering in 1964 from Chalmers University of Technology and his Ph.D. in Biomedical Engineering in 1971 from Uppsala University. In 1963-1972 he worked as a Research Associate at Uppsala University. He is since 1972 Professor of Biomedical Engineering at Linköping University. He is also active at the Linköping University Hospital.

Öberg's research interests are in circulatory physiology, bio-optics, biomedical instrumentation, sensors and clinical engineering. He has published over 400 scientific papers and books in these areas.

Öberg is the founding chairman of the Clinical Engineering Division of the International Federation for Medical and Biological Engineering. This same organization has also elected him as an honorary life member. He is a former president of the Swedish Society of Medical Physics and Medical Engineering and a former chairman of the International Academy of Medical and Biological Engineering within the International Federation for Medical and Biological Engineering.

== Honours ==
- Vladimir K. Zworykin Award, International Federation for Medical and Biological Engineering, 2003.
- Honorary Life Member, International Federation for Medical and Biological Engineering, 2000
- Fellow, American Institute for Medical and Biological Engineering
- Honorary Member of the Hungarian Academy of Engineering, 1994.
- Honorary Member of the Finnish Society for Medical Physics and Medical Engineering, 1988
- Member of the Royal Swedish Academy of Sciences, 1987.
- Fernström Prize, Lund University, 1981
- Member of the Royal Swedish Academy of Engineering Sciences, 1980.
- Erna Ebeling Prize, Swedish Society for Medical Engineering and Medical Physics, 1977
