= Woolmer Lecture =

The flagship lecture of the Institute of Physics and Engineering in Medicine

The Woolmer lecture is the flagship lecture of the Institute of Physics and Engineering in Medicine. It takes place annually during the Institute's Medical Physics and Engineering Conference.

== Dedication ==
The lecture is dedicated to Professor Ronald Woolmer (1908–1962) who was the first Director of the Research Department of Anaesthetics at the Royal College of Surgeons. Woolmer convened a meeting at the Royal College of Surgeons, London, to discuss the evolving field of engineering applied to medicine. It was agreed that the group should hold regular meetings and as a result the Biological Engineering Society (BES) was formed with Ronald Woolmer as the first President. Woolmer died two years after the formation of the BES and it was agreed that a memorial lecture would be sponsored in recognition of his achievements.

== Lecturers ==
Years	Name	Lecture title	Image
1963	A. C. Dornhorst	The Influence of Engineering Techniques on Biological Thought, with Particular Reference to Analogue and Conceptual Models	
1964	George Godber	Measurement and Mechanisation in Medicine	
1965	–	Title	
1966	Ludwig Guttmann	Physiological Integration of the Spinal Man	
1967	Andrew F. Huxley	Forgetting and Rediscovery in Physiology	
1968	Roy Yorke Calne	Organ Substitution — Biological or Mechanical?	
1969	–	Title	
1970	Lord Bowden	The Social Implications of Technology	
1971	T. Z. Young	The Worlds of Animals, Men and Gods	
1972	Lord Brock of Wimbledon	The Changing Face of Surgery and the Part Played by Bioengineering	
1973	Peter Medawar	All engineering is bioengineering	
1974	–	Title	
1975	–	Title	
1976	–	Title	
1977	David C. Simpson	Arms: Natural & Artificial	
1978	Geoffrey Allen	Technology in Medicine — Present and Future	
1979	–	Title	
1980	William Gosling	Biology and Engineering — an historic convergence	
1981	–	Title	
1982	–	Title	
1983	–	Title	
1984	M. M. Jordan	Title	
1985	–	Title	
1986	–	Biological design — a neglected art	
1987	–	Title	
1988	John Ashworth	Title	
1989	–	Title	
1990	–	Title	
1991	–	Title	
1992	–	Title	
1993	–	Title	
1994	–	Title	
1995	–	Title	
1996	–	Title	
1997	–	Title	
1998	–	Title	
1999	–	Title	
2000	–	Title	
2001	–	Title	
2002	Anthony Unsworth	Hip Joint replacement	
2003	Arun Holden	Title	
2004	Kevin Warwick	Title	
2005	Henrik Gollee	Assistive technologies for function restoration	
2006	Denis Noble	Cardiac Modelling	
2007	Michael Brady	Colorectal and Liver Cancer Image Analysis	
2008	Clive Hahn	Bioengineering Aspects of the Lung: Models and Measurements	
2009	Martin Birchall	Regenerative Medicine: new challenges, new hopes	
2010	Mark Tooley	Imitating the Patient	
2011	Willi Kalender	Developments in Computed Tomography: Is sub-mSv a realistic option?	
2012	Lionel Tarassenko	Physiology-Driven Signal Analysis and Data Fusion	
2013	Molly Stevens	Designing Biomaterials for Ultrasensitive Biosensing and Regenerative Medicine	
2014	David Keating	Medical Physics: A Gateway to Innovation	
2015	Anthony Barker	Transcranial magnetic stimulation - the first 30 years	
2016	Andrew Taylor	Can Engineering and Imaging help us design Cardiovascular devices?	
2017	Josef Käs	Why do rigid tumours contain soft cancer cells?	
2018	Alison Noble	Human Image Recognition, Artificial Intelligence and Shifting Perceptions of Medical Ultrasound	
2026	Professor Chris Hopkins	Beyond Boundaries: Where Science Changes Lives	Professor Chris Hopkins

== See also ==
- List of medicine awards
