= Australasian College of Physical Scientists and Engineers in Medicine =

- Abbreviation: ACPSEM
- Formation: 1977
- Region served: Australia, New Zealand
- Official language: English
- President: Kym Rykers
- Vice-President: Kevin Hickson
- Honorary Treasurer: Michael Bernardo
- Website: http://www.acpsem.org.au

The Australasian College of Physical Scientists and Engineers in Medicine (ACPSEM) is a professional organisation for medical physicists, biomedical engineers and allied professionals in Australia and New Zealand. The ACPSEM was first incorporated in 1977 as the Australasian College of Physical Scientists in Medicine. The college was formed from the earlier Australian Regional Group of the Hospital Physicists Association (UK), Biophysics Group of the Australian Institute of Physics and New Zealand Medical Physics and Biomedical Engineering Association. The college was admitted to membership of the International Organization for Medical Physics in 1986.

The ACPSEM facilitates training and professional accreditation for practising medical physicists in Australia and New Zealand. This includes significant support for the TEAP training program for medical physics trainees. The ACPSEM also promotes education and research into the biomedical applications of physics, mathematics, engineering and computing.

The ACPSEM publishes position papers and topical debates developed with the aim of providing opinions and evidence-based, best-practice guidelines regarding topics and emerging issues relevant to ACPSEM and based on a critical analysis of current facts, data and research.

The ACPSEM has an official scientific journal, Physical & Engineering Sciences in Medicine, which is published 4 times a year. The ACPSEM holds an annual Engineering and Physical Sciences in Medicine conference, and has done every year since 1961.

== Organisation ==
The ACPSEM is governed by an elected board known as the ACPSEM Council, who are elected for two year terms.

The local interests of the membership is represented by 6 individual branches, approximately corresponding to states:

- New South Wales / Australian Capital Territory
- New Zealand
- Queensland
- South Australia / Northern Territory
- Victoria / Tasmania
- Western Australia

A number of specialty groups exist to represent membership interests within a number of specific areas:

- Biomedical Engineering
- University
- Radiation Oncology
- Radiology
- Nuclear Medicine
- Radiation Protection
- Radiopharmaceutical Sciences

== Membership ==
There are 4 levels of individual membership:

- Fellow Membership (FACPSEM): For members who have made an outstanding contribution to engineering or physical science applied to medicine.
- Ordinary Membership (MACPSEM): For graduates with a relevant degree in physics or engineering and a few years of relevant experience.
- Associate Membership (AMACPSEM): For graduates with a relevant degree in physics or engineering.
- Affiliate Membership: For students who do not currently have a tertiary qualification in physical science or engineering.

The ACPSEM also provides a company associate membership for corporations.

== Awards ==
The ACPSEM distributes a number of regular prizes via the Better Healthcare Technology Foundation, including:

- Boyce Worthley Young Achiever Award: recognising outstanding work in the profession
- Richard Bates Travel Scholarship: to assist a physicist to undertake a period of study or research overseas
- David Robinson Innovation Award: to assist a member present innovative work of an engineering or diagnostic imaging nature

Additionally, the college has presented the ACPSEM Distinguished Service Award to members who have made outstanding contributions to the college.

== See also ==
- American Association of Physicists in Medicine
- Biomedical engineering
- Institute of Physics and Engineering in Medicine
- Medical physics
