= Gel dosimetry =

Fricke dosimeter prepared using a gelling agent

Gel dosimeters, also called Fricke gel dosimeters, are manufactured from radiation sensitive chemicals that, upon irradiation with ionising radiation, undergo a fundamental change in their properties as a function of the absorbed radiation dose.

Over many years individuals have endeavoured to measure absorbed radiation dose distributions using gels. As long ago as 1950, the radiation-induced colour change in dyes was used to investigate radiation doses in gels. Further, in 1957 depth doses of photons and electrons in agar gels were investigated using spectrophotometry. Gel dosimetry today however, is founded mainly on the work of Gore et al who in 1984 demonstrated that changes due to ionising radiation in Fricke dosimetry solutions, developed in the 1920s, could be measured using nuclear magnetic resonance (NMR).

Gel dosimeters generally consist of two types; Fricke and polymer gel dosimeters and are usually evaluated or 'read-out' using magnetic resonance imaging (MRI), optical computer tomography (CT), x-ray CT or ultrasound.

Since 1999 the DosGel and IC3DDose Conference Series on gel dosimetry has been held at various international venues.

== Fricke gel dosimeters ==
Gore et al investigated the nuclear magnetic resonance (NMR) relaxation properties of irradiated Fricke or ferrous sulphate dosimetry solutions showing that radiation-induced changes, in which ferrous (Fe^{2+}) ions are converted to ferric (Fe^{3+}) ions, could be quantified using NMR relaxation measurements. In 1986 Appleby et al reported that Fricke dosimetry solutions dispersed throughout a gel matrix could be used to obtain three-dimensional (3D) spatial dose information using magnetic resonance imaging (MRI). It was subsequently shown that irradiated Fricke-type gel dosimeters did not retain a spatially stable dose distribution due to ion diffusion within the irradiated dosimeters. Fricke solutions with various gelling agents such as gelatine, agarose, sephadex and polyvinyl alcohol (PVA) were investigated along with chelating agents such as xylenol orange (XO) to reduce diffusion. Numerous authors subsequently published results of their work to inhibit the ion diffusion with limited success and which was summarised by Baldock et al in 2001. By the early 1990s the diffusion problem was considered to be a significant one in the advancement of gel dosimetry.

== Polymer gel dosimeters ==
Polymer systems for the use of radiation dosimetry were first proposed as early as 1954, where Alexander et al discussed the effects of ionising radiation on polymethylmethacrylate. Following this, Hoecker et al in 1958 investigated the dosimetry of radiation-induced polymerisation in liquids, and in 1961 Boni used polyacrylamide as a gamma dosimeter. Much later in 1991, Audet et al reported changes in NMR transverse relaxation measurements of irradiated polyethylene oxide. In 1992, Kennan et al reported on NMR longitudinal relaxation studies performed on an irradiated aqueous solution of N,N’-methylene-bis-acrylamide and agarose, which showed that the relaxation rates increased with absorbed dose.

In 1992 a new gel dosimetry formulation was proposed by Maryanski et al, which was based on the polymerisation of acrylamide and N,N’-methylene-bis-acrylamide (bis) monomers infused in an aqueous agarose matrix. This system was given the acronym BANANA due to the use of the chemical components (bis, acrylamide, nitrous oxide and agarose). This type of gel dosimeter did not have the associated diffusion problem of Fricke gels and was shown to have a relatively stable post-irradiation dose distribution. The polymerisation reaction occurred by cross-linking of the monomers induced by the free radical products of water radiolysis. In 1994 the BANANA formulation was refined by replacing agarose with gelatine and given the acronym BANG (bis, acrylamide, nitrogen and aqueous gelatine), the first of a series of new polymer gel formulations. In 1994 this formulation was patented and became commercially available through MGS Research Inc. as BANG®. Subsequently, due to the naming of the commercial product, PAG became the polymer gel dosimeter acronym of choice for most authors. Numerous authors subsequently published results of work investigating different compositions and formulations of polymer gel dosimeters which were summarised by Lepage et al.

Although polymer-type dosimeters did not have the diffusion limitations of Fricke-type gel dosimeters, there was another significant limitation in their use. Due to the nature of their free radical chemistry, polymer gel dosimeters were susceptible to atmospheric oxygen inhibition of the polymerisation processes. As a result, these gel dosimeters had to be manufactured in an oxygen-free environment, such as in a glove box pumped with nitrogen gas. Along with the use of potentially toxic chemicals, this was a significant limitation in the introduction of gel dosimetry into the clinic.

During this period a number of studies were undertaken to investigate the clinical applications of radiological tissue-equivalent PAG-type polymer gel dosimeters using MRI. De Deene et al undertook an investigation into the overall accuracy of an anthropomorphic polymer gel dosimetry phantom for the verification of conformal radiotherapy treatments. It was established that significant issues relating to the accuracy of this dosimetry technique were a result of oxygen inhibition in the polymer gel and MRI imaging artefacts.

Authors continued to investigate clinical aspects of polymer gel dosimetry using MRI including conformal therapy, IMRT and IMAT, stereotactic radiosurgery, brachytherapy, low energy X-rays, high-LET and proton therapy, boron capture neutron therapy and tissue inhomogeneities.

== Normoxic polymer gel dosimeters ==
A significant development in the field of gel dosimetry occurred when results of using an alternative polymer gel dosimeter formulation were published by Fong et al in 2001. This new type of polymer gel dosimeter, known as MAGIC gel, bound atmospheric oxygen in a metallo-organic complex thus removing the problem of oxygen inhibition and enabling polymer gels to be manufactured on the bench-top in the laboratory. This created what was to be known as a normoxic gel dosimeter, compared with the previous PAG formulation which subsequently became known as a hypoxic gel dosimeter. The MAGIC polymer gel formulation consisted of methacrylic acid, ascorbic acid, gelatine and copper. The principal behind the MAGIC gel is in the ascorbic acid oxygen scavenger. Ascorbic acid binds free oxygen contained within the aqueous gelatine matrix into metallo-organic complexes and this process is initiated by copper sulphate. It was subsequently shown by De Deene et al in 2002 that other antioxidants could be used in the manufacture of normoxic gels including tetrakis (hydroxymethyl) phosphonium chloride, having first been suggested to Baldock by Billingham in 1996. Numerous authors subsequently published results of work investigating different compositions and formulations of normoxic polymer gel dosimeters and were summarised by Senden. Other work has also included the development of less toxic polymer gels.

The fundamental science underpinning polymer gel dosimetry was reviewed along with the various 'read-out' and evaluation techniques and clinical dosimetry applications in the 2010 Topical Review publication by Baldock et al.

== DosGel and IC3DDose conference series ==
In June 1995 whilst attending the American Association of Physicists in Medicine (AAPM) annual meeting in Boston, US, Clive Baldock and L. John Schreiner discussed the appropriateness of organising some form of specialist meeting or workshop on gel dosimetry. In September 1996 Clive Baldock and Lars Olsson, whilst attending the European Society for Radiotherapy & Oncology (ESTRO) annual meeting in Vienna, Austria initiated the organising of the international conference series on gel dosimetry which began as DosGel 99, the 1st International Workshop on Radiation Therapy Gel Dosimetry held in Lexington, Kentucky in 1999 and hosted by Geoff Ibbott. Since 1999, subsequent DosGel conferences were held in Brisbane, Australia (2001), Ghent, Belgium (2004), Sherbrooke, Canada (2006) and Crete, Greece (2008). In 2010 the conference was held in Hilton Head, South Carolina, USA and underwent a name-change to IC3DDose. Subsequent IC3DDose conferences were held in Sydney, Australia (2012), Ystad, Sweden (2014), Galveston, Texas, USA (2016), Kushan, China (2018) and virtually (2021).

The aim of the first workshop was to bring together individuals, both researchers and users, with an interest in the application of 3-dimensional radiation dosimetry techniques in the treatment of cancer, with a mix of presentations from basic science to clinical applications. This has remained an objective for all of the conferences. One rationale of DosGel 99 was stated as supporting the increasing clinical implementation of gel dosimetry, as the technique appeared, at that time, to be leaving the laboratories of gel dosimetry enthusiasts and entering clinical practice. Clearly by labelling the first workshop as the 1st, there was a vision of a continuing series, which has been fulfilled. On the other hand, the expectation of widespread clinical use of gel dosimetry has perhaps not been what was hoped for and anticipated. Nevertheless, the rapidly increasing demand for advanced high-precision 3D radiotherapy technology and techniques has continued apace. The need for practical and accurate 3D dosimetry methods for development and quality assurance has only increased. By the 6th meeting, held in South Carolina in 2010, the Conference Scientific Committee recognised the wider developments in 3D systems and methods and decided to widen the scope, whilst keeping the same span from basic science to applications. This was signalled by a change of name from DosGel to IC3DDose, a name that has continued to the latest conference, the 11th IC3DDose conference, held virtually in May 2021.

== See also ==
- Hugo Fricke
