= Canadian Medical and Biological Engineering Society =

Canadian technical society

- Founded: 1965
- Founder: John Alexander Hopps
- Type: Professional Organization
- Purpose: Biomedical Engineering; Clinical Engineering; Medical Engineering; Healthcare Technology Management
- Location: Ottawa, Ontario, Canada
- Region served: Canada
- Method: Conferences, Publications
- Members: 200+
- Key people: Mike Capuano, President
- Website: cmbes.ca

The Canadian Medical and Biological Engineering Society (CMBES) is a technical society representing the biomedical engineering community in Canada. CMBES is supported by its membership which consists of biomedical engineers, biomedical engineering technologists and students. CMBES also hosts an annual conference and regular webinars. It produces a number of publications including the Clinical Engineering Standards of Practice and a Newsletter. The Society's aims are twofold: scientific and educational: directed toward the advancement of the theory and practice of medical device technology; and professional: directed toward the advancement of all individuals in Canada who are engaged in interdisciplinary work involving engineering, the life sciences and medicine.

== Conference ==
The first Canadian Medical and Biological Engineering Conference was held September 8 and 9, 1966 in Ottawa, Ontario. CMBES continues to host an annual conference including sponsor seminars, technical paper presentations including peer-reviews, a conference proceedings, affiliation with Journal of Medical and Biological Engineering, vendor exhibit of current medical devices, a continuing education program, workshops, symposia, and networking opportunities.

The location of the conference rotates between Canadian cities every year. Occasionally the conference is held in conjunction with like organisations. Partnerships in the past have included: IEEE Engineering in Medicine and Biology Society (EMBS), Festival of International Conferences on Caregiving, Disability, Aging and Technology (FICCDAT) and the International Union for Physical and Engineering Sciences in Medicine (IUPESM).

In 2015, the CMBES and IUPESM hosted the World Congress on Medical Physics & Biomedical Engineering, in Toronto Ontario, Canada.

Annual conference proceedings are published online under International Standard Serial Number (ISSN) 2371-9516.

== International Outreach ==
The objective of the Committee is to pursue and develop opportunities for CMBES members to participate in volunteer programs to support Clinical Engineering initiatives and Health Technology Management in developing countries.

== Clinical Engineering Standards of Practice ==
The CMBES Clinical Engineering Standards of Practice for Canada (CESOP) was first published in 1998 and revised in 2007 and 2014. These guidelines outline criteria for health care institutions on the management of medical devices, promote the professional development of its members, and outline the education and certification requirements for clinical engineers and biomedical engineering technologists and technicians.

== Affiliations ==
CMBES is a member society of the Engineering Institute of Canada and the International Federation for Medical and Biological Engineering. They also have affiliation agreements with the Association des physiciens et ingénieurs biomédicaux du Québec and Atlantic Canada Clinical Engineering Society.

== Awards ==
Awards are bestowed to recipients annually, upon recommendation of the awards committee to the CMBES Executive. Award categories include:

- Outstanding Canadian Biomedical Engineer
- Outstanding Canadian BMET
- Early Career Achievement

== Special Membership Recognition/Honours ==
Special Membership status is awarded only to distinguished individuals who have made significant contributions to the profession of biomedical engineering and to the Society in particular.

- Fellow
- Emeritus
- Honorary

The CMBES has bestowed the fellow award on some of the following notable Canadian individuals: James McEwen (engineer), Monique Frize, Morris Milner, and John Alexander Hopps amongst others.
