= RCF =

RCF may refer to:

== Science and technology ==
- Refractory ceramic fibre, an aluminium silicate wool insulation, see High temperature insulation wool
- Rey-Osterrieth Complex Figure or Rey complex figure, a neuropsychological test
- Radio Communication Failure, a transponder code (see NORDO)
- Relative centrifugal force, the acceleration in a centrifuge normalized to Earth's gravity
- A Lexus RC F
- Rolling contact fatigue, a deformation mechanism
- Radiochromic film, a type of radiation detector

== Mathematics ==
- Rational canonical form in abstract algebra
- Real closed field in mathematics
- Row canonical form in linear algebra

== Companies ==
- Rail Coach Factory, Kapurthala, India
- Rashtriya Chemicals & Fertilizers, Mumbai, India
- RCF audio, an Italian pro audio manufacturer

== Other ==
- Ratchet & Clank Future: Tools of Destruction, a video game
- Revolving credit facility
- Racing Club de France, an omnisport club in Paris
- Russian Curling Federation, a member of the World Curling Federation
