= Stephen O'Connor (academic) =

Stephen O’Connor is a chartered professor of biomedical engineering at the School of Mathematics, Computer Science and Engineering, University of London. He is former President of the Institute of Physics and Engineering in Medicine (IPEM). He is also an Honorary Fellow of the Royal College of Physicians and a Fellow of the Royal Academy of Engineering.
