= Medical Physics (journal) =

- Discipline: Physics, medicine
- Language: English
- Edited by: John M. Boone

Publication details
- History: 1974; 51 years ago – present
- Publisher: Wiley (US)
- Frequency: Monthly
- Open access: Hybrid
- Impact factor: 4.506 (2021)

Standard abbreviations
- ISO 4: Med. Phys.

Indexing
- CODEN: MPHYA6
- ISSN: 0094-2405 (print); 2473-4209 (web)
- LCCN: 74645246
- OCLC no.: 01794379

Links
- Journal homepage

Medical Physics is a monthly peer-reviewed scientific journal covering research on medical physics. The first issue was published in January 1974. Medical Physics is an official journal of the American Association of Physicists in Medicine, the Canadian Organization of Medical Physicists, the Canadian College of Physicists in Medicine and the International Organization for Medical Physics. The editor-in-chief is John M. Boone (UC Davis Medical Center).

In 2013, the journal announced that it was changing from a traditional to a hybrid open-access format. In 2017, the journal transferred from being published by the American Institute of Physics to Wiley.

== Abstracting and indexing ==
Medical Physics is indexed in:

- Chemical Abstracts Service
- Index Medicus/MEDLINE/PubMed
- Scopus

According to the Journal Citation Reports, the journal has a 2021 impact factor of 4.506, ranking it 44th out of 136 journals in the category "Radiology, Nuclear Medicine & Medical Imaging".
