= Dobrinka Tabakova =

British/Bulgarian composer (born 1980)

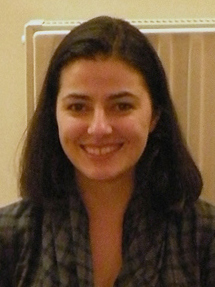
- Born: 1980; Plovdiv
- Education: Guildhall School of Music and Drama
- Occupation: Composer
- Website: www.dobrinka.com

Dobrinka Tabakova (Bulgarian: Добринка Табакова; born 1980, Plovdiv, Bulgaria) is a Bulgarian-British composer.

== Early life and education ==
Dobrinka Tabakova was born in Plovdiv, Bulgaria, to medical physicists Vassilka and Slavik Tabakov. She won the Jean-Frederic Perrenoud Prize of the 4th International Competition of Music in Vienna when she was 14 years old. She studied at Alleyn's School London and the Royal Academy of Music in London and graduated from Guildhall School of Music and Drama (GSMD) in London. Afterwards she was awarded a Ph.D. in composition from King's College, London. She studied composition under Simon Bainbridge, Diana Burrell, Robert Keeley and Andrew Schultz. She has also attended master classes given by John Adams, Louis Andriessen, Alexander Goehr, Olav Anton Thommessen and Iannis Xenakis.

== Compositional career ==
Dobrinka Tabakova's "Praise" was sung at St. Paul's Cathedral to celebrate the Golden Jubilee of Queen Elizabeth II in 2002. She won the GSMD Lutosławski Composition Prize in 1999 and the Adam Prize of King's College London in 2007. In 2011 Dobrinka Tabakova was awarded first prize and medal of the Sorel Organization's choral competition in New York.

Tabakova has received commissions from the Royal Philharmonic Society, BBC Radio 3, Cheltenham Music Festival, Britten Sinfonia, Three Choirs Festival, Wigmore Hall and the PRS for Music Foundation's first UK New Music Biennial in 2014.

Tabakova's compositions have been performed at music festivals throughout Britain, in Bulgaria, Hong Kong, Russia and throughout Europe and the United States. She was Composer in Residence at the Utrecht International Chamber Music Festival; at the Kremerata Baltica Festival in Sigulda, Latvia; at the Lockenhaus Chamber Music Festival, Austria; and for the BBC Concert Orchestra. Tabakova has worked with orchestras including Academy of Saint Martin in the Fields, Munich Chamber Orchestra, Lithuanian Chamber Orchestra, Kammerorchester des Bayerischen Rundfunks, Amsterdam Sinfonietta, Orchestra of the Swan and BBC National Orchestra of Wales. Her works have especially been performed by the violist Maxim Rysanov, as well as violinists Gidon Kremer and Janine Jansen, and pianist Ivan Yanakov.

Dobrinka Tabakova's works have been recorded for Hyperion Records and the Avie record label and in 2013 ECM Records released an album devoted to her music, entitled String Paths. The album reached No.2 in the UK specialist classical chart and attracted numerous positive reviews. On 6 December 2013 String Paths was nominated for the 56th Annual Grammy Awards in the category "Best Classical Compendium" and was announced as one of the four albums supporting the Grammy nomination of ECM's founder and president Manfred Eicher for "Producer of the Year, Classical".

Tabakova won an Ivor Novello Award at The Ivors Classical Awards 2023. Swarm Fanfares, composed for youth orchestra, won the award for Best Community and Participation Composition.

Tabakova's music is published by Schott Music.

== Selected works ==
=== Orchestral ===
- Concerto for Viola and Strings (2004)
- Schubert Arpeggione Sonata arrangement for string orchestra (2004)
- Suite in Old Style for viola, strings and harpsichord (2004)
- Concerto for Cello and Strings (2008)
- Sun Triptych for solo violin, cello and strings (2007–09)
- Concerto for Piano and Orchestra (2010)
- Fantasy homage to Schubert for string orchestra (2013)

=== Chamber and solo instrumental ===
- Modetudes for solo piano (1998)
- In Focus for chamber ensemble (1999)
- Pirin for solo viola (2000)
- Insight for string trio (2002)
- Whispered Lullaby for viola and piano (2004)
- Frozen River Flows for oboe & percussion (2005)
- Such different paths for string septet (2008)
- Suite in Jazz Style for viola and piano (2008)
- Diptych for organ (2009)
- The Smile of the Flamboyant Wings, for string quartet (2010)

=== Choral ===
- Praise for S.A.T.B. choir and organ (2002)
- Of the Sun Born (От Слънце Родена) for S.A.T.B. choir and soprano solo (2008)
- On the South Downs for solo cello, orchestra and S.A.T.B. choir (2009)
- Syng, hevin imperiall for S.A.T.B. choir and organ (2011)
- Centuries of Meditations for S.A.T.B. choir, string orchestra and harp (2012)
- Alma Redemptoris Mater for S.A.T.B. choir (2014)
- Truro Canticles for S.A.T.B. Choir and organ (2017)
