= Medical & Biological Engineering & Computing =

- Discipline: Biomedical Engineering
- Language: English
- Edited by: Nitish Thakor

Publication details
- Former name(s): Medical Electronics & Biological Engineering
- History: 1963-present
- Publisher: Springer Science+Business Media on behalf of the International Federation of Medical and Biological Engineering
- Frequency: Monthly
- Impact factor: 2.602 (2020)

Standard abbreviations
- ISO 4: Med. Biol. Eng. Comput.

Indexing
- CODEN: MBECDY
- ISSN: 0140-0118 (print); 1741-0444 (web)
- LCCN: 77648223
- OCLC no.: 464907294

Links
- Journal homepage; Online access

Medical & Biological Engineering & Computing is a monthly peer-reviewed medical journal and an official publication of the International Federation of Medical and Biological Engineering. It is published by Springer Science+Business Media. It covers research in biomedical engineering and bioengineering. It was established as a bimonthly publication in 1963 under the title Medical Electronics & Biological Engineering. It publishes original research articles, reviews, and technical notes.
