= Project EMITEL =

Medical physics encyclopaedia project

The Project EMITEL was a pilot project of the EC Programme Leonardo da Vinci, which developed the first e-Encyclopaedia with Multilingual Scientific Dictionary of medical physics (2005–2009), aimed to support the education in the profession. The project continues activities of previous projects (as EMERALD, EMERALD2 and EMIT) to develop materials and e-books for medical physics education.

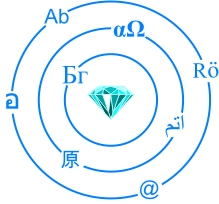
EMITEL Project Logo

The project included as partners Universities and Hospitals from the UK, Sweden, Italy, Bulgaria and the International Organization for Medical Physics (IOMP) and was headed by specialists from King's College London. In the post-project time the Encyclopaedia with Dictionary were updated by hundreds of specialists from over 50 countries, overseen by an editorial board. The materials are available for free use through their original website emitel2.eu with thousands of users worldwide.

The Encyclopaedia has been printed on paper by CRC Press/Routledge (Taylor and Francis Group).
