= Hugo Fricke =

Danish-American physicist

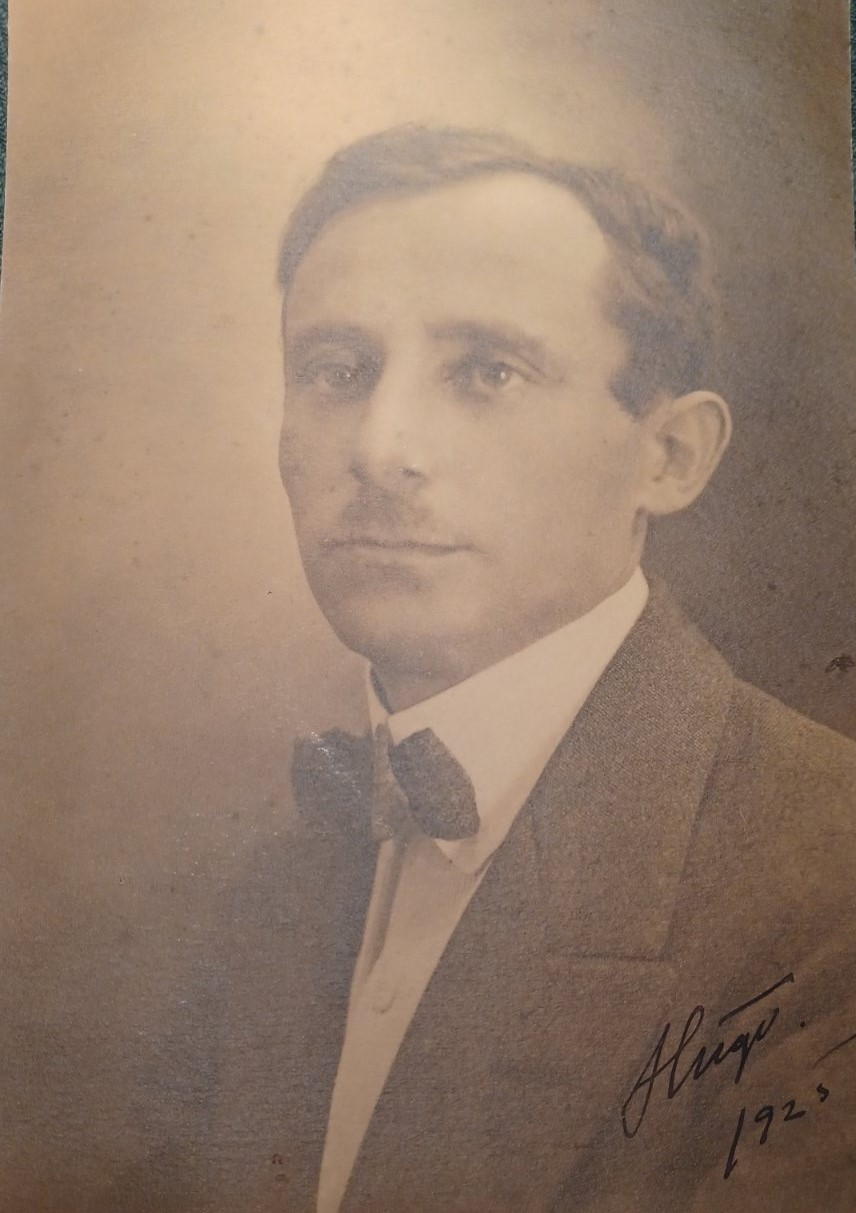
- Hugo Fricke, 1923
- Born: August 15, 1892; Aarhus, Denmark
- Died: April 5, 1972 (aged 79); Huntington, New York, US
- Education: University of Copenhagen
- Scientific career
- Institutions: Lund University; Columbia University; Harvard University; Cleveland Clinic; Cold Spring Harbor Laboratory; Argonne National Laboratory

Hugo Fricke (August 15, 1892 – April 5, 1972) was a Danish-American physicist who studied the chemical (radiolysis) and biological (radiation biology) effects of X-ray and electron beams and who also invented the Fricke dosimeter named after him. He also made important contributions to the theory of impedance measurements.

== Early life, education and career ==
Hugo Fricke was born on August 15, 1892, in Aarhus, Denmark, to Hedevig (née Kämpfner) and Gunnar Fricke, the oldest of four siblings. Fricke relocated to Copenhagen in 1910, where he studied at the University of Copenhagen from 1910 to 1916, where he also worked as an assistant to Niels Bohr. In 1918, he moved to Lund University where he worked with Manne Siegbahn on X-ray spectroscopy. In 1919 he emigrated to the US, working at Columbia University and at Harvard University with Theodore Lyman until 1921. He moved to Cleveland Clinic by invitation of George Crile to head a biophysics laboratory between 1921 and 1928. Afterwards, Fricke was hired by Charles Davenport to work at Cold Spring Harbor Laboratory in Cold Spring Harbor from 1928 to 1955. He worked at Argonne National Laboratory from 1955 and at the Danish Atomic Energy Laboratory, now Risø DTU, from 1966 onwards. In 1949 he married Dorothy Newman.

During his stay at Cleveland Clinic, Fricke and colleagues discovered the radiation response of ferrous sulphate that eventually resulted in the widely used dosimeter named after him. His research at Cold Spring Harbor Laboratory laid the foundation for the understanding of the radiation chemistry of water.

== Honors and awards ==
In 1972 he was awarded the Weiss Medal of the Association for Radiation Research. He was elected a Fellow of the American Physical Society in 1928.

== See also ==
- Gel dosimetry
- Joseph Joshua Weiss
- Milton Burton
