= Rod Smallwood (medical engineer) =

British medical engineer and computer scientist

Professor Rod Smallwood FREng, HonFRCP, FIET, FInstP, FIPEM
- Born: Rodney Harris Smallwood; 1945 (age 80–81)
- Education: University College London; Lancaster University
- Occupations: medical engineer; computer scientist
- Employers: National Health Service England; University of Sheffield

Professor Rodney Harris Smallwood FREng, HonFRCP, FIET, FInstP, FIPEM (born 1945), known as Rod, is a British medical engineer and computer scientist.

Smallwood graduated in Physics from University College London, then studied solid-state physics at Lancaster University, before working for the National Health Service in Sheffield and gaining a PhD from the University of Sheffield.

He was appointed Professor of Medical Engineering and Head of the academic Medical Physics and Clinical Engineering Department at the University of Sheffield in 1995, took a computer science post in 2002, and subsequently became Professor of Computational Systems Biology and the Director of Research for Engineering.

He has served as president of the Institute of Physics and Engineering in Medicine.
