= Molly Stevens =

British academic

Professor Dame Molly Stevens DBE FRS FMedSci FInstP FCGI FREng FRSC FIMMM FRSB FRPharmS
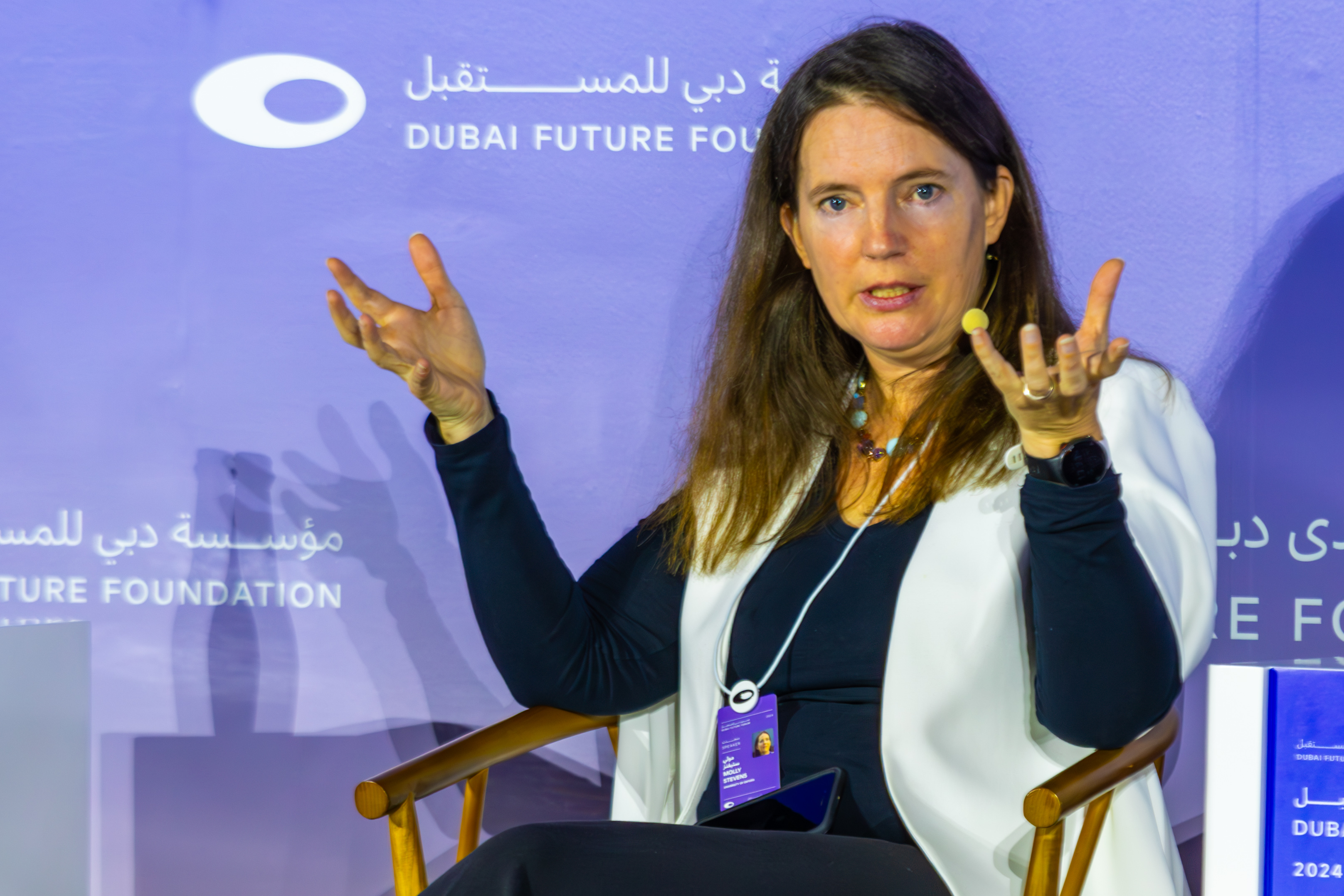
- Stevens at the Dubai Future Forum (2024)
- Education: University of Bath (BPharm); University of Nottingham (PhD)
- Awards: Woolmer Lecture (2013); Kabiller Young Investigator Award (2019); FEBS/EMBO Women in Science Award (2021)
- Scientific career
- Fields: Regenerative medicine Biosensing; Tissue engineering
- Workplaces: University of Oxford
- Thesis: Atomic force microscopy studies of biomolecular adhesion and mechanics (2000)
- Molly Stevens's voice from the BBC programme Life Scientific, 15 November 2011.
- Website: https://www.dpag.ox.ac.uk/research/stevens-group

Dame Molly Morag Stevens (May 1974-)is the John Black Professor of Bionanoscience at the University of Oxford's Department of Physiology, Anatomy & Genetics. She is Deputy Director of the Kavli Institute for Nanoscience Discovery and a member of the Department for Engineering Science and the Institute for Biomedical Engineering.

She studied at the University of Bath, where she graduated with a first-class honours BPharm degree. She subsequently obtained a PhD degree from the University of Nottingham for research using atomic force microscopy to investigate adhesion and mechanics.

== Career and research ==
Following her doctoral research, she moved to the Massachusetts Institute of Technology where she worked as a postdoctoral researcher before joining Imperial College London in 2004 and then the University of Oxford in 2023.

In 2004 Stevens founded The Stevens Group, a multidisciplinary research group of bioengineers, materials scientists, chemists, biologists, physicists and surgeons.

=== Honours and awards ===
2010: In 2010 she received the International Union of Pure and Applied Chemistry (IUPAC) award for creativity in polymer science, the Institute of Materials, Minerals and Mining Rosenhain Medal and the Norman Heatley Award for interdisciplinary research from the Royal Society of Chemistry (RSC). She serves as an Associate Editor of ACS Nano.

2013: In 2013 she presented the Woolmer Lecture of the Institute of Physics and Engineering in Medicine. In 2013 she was awarded the prestigious Karen Burt Memorial Award from the Women's Engineering Society, given to the best newly chartered woman in engineering, applied science or IT.

2018: She was appointed a trustee of the National Gallery of the United Kingdom in 2018. She won the 2018 Institute of Physics (IOP) Rosalind Franklin Medal and Prize. In 2019 Stevens was elected a foreign member of the National Academy of Engineering of the United States and received the Kabiller Young Investigator Award. She was elected a Fellow of the Royal Society (FRS) in 2020.

2019: Stevens was awarded an Honorary Doctorate of Science (DSc) by the University of Bath.

2021: In 2021 Stevens was the recipient of the Federation of European Biochemical Societies (FEBS) EMBO Women in Science Award.

2023: In 2023 Stevens was awarded The Novo Nordisk Prize for her pioneering work in innovative bioengineering approaches.

2024: In 2024 Stevens was appointed Dame Commander of the Order of the British Empire (DBE) in the 2024 New Year Honours for services to medicine.
