= International Federation of Medical and Biological Engineering =

- Abbreviation: IFMBE
- Formation: 1959
- Region served: Global
- Official language: English
- President: Ratko Magjarevic
- Website: http://www.ifmbe.org

The International Federation of Medical and Biological Engineering (IFMBE) was initially formed as International Federation for Medical Electronics and Biological Engineering during the 2nd International Conference of Medical and Biological Engineering, in the UNESCO Building, Paris, France in 1959. It is primarily a federation of national and transnational organizations. These organizations represent national interests in medical and biological engineering.

The objectives of the IFMBE are scientific, technological, literary, and educational. Within the field of medical, biological and clinical engineering IFMBE's aims are to encourage research and the application of knowledge, and to disseminate information and promote collaboration.

== History ==
In 1959, a group of medical engineers, physicists and physicians met at the 2nd International Conference of Medical and Biological Engineering, in the UNESCO Building, Paris, France to create an organization entitled International Federation for Medical Electronics and Biological Engineering. At that time there were few national biomedical engineering societies and workers in the discipline joined as Associates of the Federation. Later, as national societies were formed, these societies became affiliates of the Federation.

In the mid-1960s, the name was shortened to International Federation for Medical and Biological Engineering. Its international conferences were held first on a yearly basis, then on a two-year basis and eventually on a three-year basis, to conform to the practice of most other international scientific bodies.

As the Federation grew, its constituency and objectives changed. During the first ten years of its existence, clinical engineering became a viable subdiscipline with an increasing number of members employed in the health care area. The IFMBE mandate was expanded to represent those engaged in research and development and in clinical engineering. The latter category now represents close to half of the total membership.

As of October 2010, IFMBE has an estimated 130,000 members in 61 affiliated organizations.

It is also associated with the International Organization for Medical Physics (IOMP) since 1976, and together the two bodies established the International Union for Physical and Engineering Sciences in Medicine (IUPESM).

== Publications ==
- Medical & Biological Engineering & Computing (ISSN 0140-0118)

The IFMBE publishes the journal Medical and Biological Engineering and Computing with Springer, aims to cover all fields of Medical and Biological Engineering and Sciences.

- IFMBE News

The IFMBE News Magazine, published electronically with Springer, documents developments in biomedical engineering.

- IFMBE Book Series

The official IFMBE book series, Biomedical Engineering represents another service to the Biomedical Engineering Community.

- IFMBE Proceedings

In co-operation with its World Congress and regional conferences, IFMBE also issues the IFMBE Proceedings Series published with Springer.

== World Congress ==
The major International Conference of the Federation is now titled the World Congress. Meetings of the Federation are combined with those of the Organization for medical Physics (IOMP) and co-ordinated by the Conference Co-ordinating Committee of the International Union for Physics and Engineering Sciences in Medicine (IUPESM). The Congresses are scheduled on a three-year basis and aligned with Federation's General Assembly meeting at which elections are held.

== Membership ==
Members of IFMBE include:

- American Institute for Medical and Biological Engineering
- Association for the Advancement of Medical Instrumentation
- Canadian Medical and Biological Engineering Society
- Hong Kong Institution of Engineers
- IEEE Engineering in Medicine & Biology Society
- Institute of Physics and Engineering in Medicine
- John von Neumann Computer Society
