= Eva Bezak =

Australian physicist

- Education: University of Adelaide, ANU
- Occupation: Chief Physicist
- Employer: University of Adelaide
- Known for: Medical Physics
- Title: Professor

Eva Bezak is a medical physicist and researcher, who was elected a Fellow of the Australian Academy of Technological Sciences and Engineering in 2025. She is a researcher in cancer therapy and medical innovation, modelling software as well as new pharmaceuticals to enhance therapies for cancer. She has served on various medical physics organisations and was president of the International Organisation for Medical Physics.

== Education and early life ==
Bezak wanted to be a scientist from an early age, including a paleontologist, digging for dinosaur bones. She started studying physics, and later enrolled in nuclear physics at university. She obtained a Bachelor and Masters of Philosophy, and had two children. When her youngest child was three months old, she then enrolled in further study, a Masters of Medical Physics, and then a PhD in nuclear physics, graduating from her PhD with two children under five years. Bezak was the first female president of the Australasian College of Physical Scientists and Engineers in Medicine (ACPSEM).

== Career ==
Bezak's research involves medical and radiation physics, working with providers of nuclear medicine and radiation oncology in the Asia-Pacific regions, partnering with both industry and medical stakeholders.

Bezak was a member of the International Union of Physics in Emergency Medicine, from 2015–2022. She was also the founding member and Chair of IUPESM Women in Medical Physics, and the Secretary General from 2019–2022. She was also the President of the Australasian College of Physical Scientists and Engineers in Medicine, and Vice President of the Australian Foundation of Medical Physics.

Bezak is also an advocate of women in STEM, and particularly supporting diversity and inclusion around medical research careers.

== Publications ==
Bezak has over 5200 citations and an H index of 39, according to Google Scholar, as at November 2025. Select publications include the following:

- Cohen C, Pignata S, Bezak E, et al. Workplace interventions to improve well-being and reduce burnout for nurses, physicians and allied healthcare professionals: a systematic review. BMJ Open 2023;13:e071203. doi: 10.1136/bmjopen-2022-071203.
- Forster, J. C., Harriss-Phillips, W. M., Douglass, M. J., & Bezak, E. (2017). A review of the development of tumor vasculature and its effects on the tumor microenvironment. Hypoxia, 5, 21–32. https://doi.org/10.2147/HP.S133231.
- James Murray, Hunter Bennett, Eva Bezak, Rebecca Perry, The role of exercise in the prevention of cancer therapy-related cardiac dysfunction in breast cancer patients undergoing chemotherapy: systematic review, European Journal of Preventive Cardiology, Volume 29, Issue 3, February 2022, Pages 463–472, https://doi.org/10.1093/eurjpc/zwab006.

== Awards and recognition ==
- 2025 - Fellow of the Australian Academy of Technological Sciences & Engineering.
- 2025 - President of the International Organisation of Medical Physics (IOMP).
- 2024 - Distinguished Service Award, Australasian College of Physical Scientists and Engineers in Medicine.
- 2020 - Channel 7 Children's Research Foundation.
- 2019 - South Australian Women's Honour Roll.
- 2019 - Innovation Grant for Development of new radioimmunotherapy agent for pancreatic cancer cells.
