= Plovdiv Medical University =

Medical school in Plovdiv, Bulgaria

Medical University Медицински университет в Пловдив
- Type: Public
- Established: 1945
- Rector: Professor Angel Uchikov, DMSc
- Faculty: 692
- Students: over 5000
- Location: Plovdiv, Bulgaria; 42°08′18″N 24°44′08″E
- Website: mu-plovdiv.bg/en/

The Medical University (Bulgarian: Медицински университет в Пловдив) in Plovdiv, Bulgaria was established in 1945.

It includes the Faculties of Medicine, Dental medicine, Pharmacy, Public Health, a Department of Languages and Specialized training, a medical college and a hospital with 2000 beds. Facilities include laboratories, clinics and units for diagnostics and treatment, research activities and training of medical and dental students. The Central University Library offers the students 170,000 volumes in many languages as well as an internet hall and a local net system (with Medline and Micromedex available). The university issues a journal called Folia Medica, which is exchanged with more than 326 specialists from over 54 countries included in Medline. Every year over 3800 Bulgarian and foreign students are trained at the Medical University – Plovdiv.

== History ==
The Medical University of Plovdiv was established as a medical faculty of Plovdiv University in 1945. In 1950 the faculty became the independent Medical Academy – Plovdiv. It was renamed in 1972 to Higher Medical Institute – Plovdiv. The Faculty of Dental Medicine was established in 1974, while a Medical College was created in 1997 as a subsidiary of the Medical University of Plovdiv. The Higher Medical Institute was renamed to Medical University of Plovdiv in 2002 after a decision by Bulgaria's National Assembly.

== Developments ==
A new building was constructed in 2005, where the Faculty of Dental Medicine is located. The new building has a floor area of 14,770 m^{2} and houses 27 clinical educational rooms, eight seminar rooms, and two auditoriums with a total of 273 places. An auditorium complex with floor area of 2750 m^{2} was built in 2011 for a total of 5,5 million euro. The new building has six conference rooms and has been nominated for Bulgarian Building of the year in the category of Culture in 2011. – especially with the improvement of the university's infrastructure and the introduction of many new programs taught in English. Moreover, foreign students may get enrolled to language courses and study in Bulgarian (which is taught for two years). In 2013 the prize for the Best Foreign Student in Bulgaria was awarded to a student from the Medical University of Plovdiv. Another new building has been constructed in 2017, it includes many offices as well as a new bookstore.

== Controversy ==
In 2013 the university was awarded the prize for "Best University" for its leading position in the field of education. The prize was awarded by the European Business Assembly (EBA) at Oxford Summit of Leaders "Science and Education" conference in Oxford, United Kingdom. On 24 July 2017 the Times newspaper exposed that awards from the EBA are fictitious with fees of up to £9300 being paid to the EBA from awards winners.

In March 2020 a British citizen and international student of the university was arrested for spreading a false allegation that 200 students of the university had tested positive for COVID-19 and that this was being concealed by the university management.

In October 2020 the university management was criticised by president of CITUB Plamen Dimitrov for the low salaries offered to university staff.

In October 2020 it was reported that the university has awarded a master's degree in public health and health management in 2010 to Desislava Yordanova despite her not successfully completing a bachelor's degree and as such being ineligible for this master's degree programme.

== Organization ==
The Medical University of Plovdiv has four faculties, one department and one Medical College:

- Training in the Faculty of Medicine lasts six years, and preclinical as well as clinical disciplines are involved, together with a one-year clinical rotation.
- The Faculty of Dental Medicine provides Masters of Science in Dental medicine and offers specialization of doctors of dental medicine.
- Students in the Faculty of Pharmacy obtain the degree of Master of Science, while taking advantage during their studies of laboratories for practical training.
- The Faculty of Public Health offers Bachelor of Health Care Management, Master of Health Care Management, Master of Management of Social Activities and Public Health, Master of Public Health and Health Management, PhD programs (both part- and full-time), other postgraduate courses and specialization of medical doctors. All diplomas (both here and in the other faculties) are EU recognized.
- The Department of Languages and Specialized Training' offers training in the Bulgarian language for foreign students as well as Latin training. Modern European languages are taught as well (available to students in the university).
- The Medical College offers eight programs.
