= Josef A. Käs =

German biophysicist

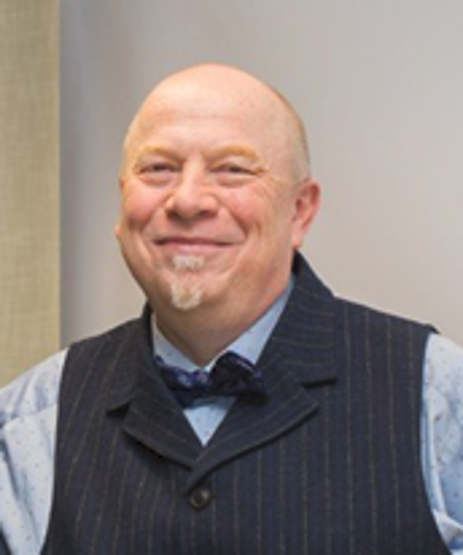
- Josef Käs in his 60s
- Born: 14 October 1961 (age 64); München, Germany
- Education: Diplom, Technical University of Munich, Germany (1990); Dr. rer. nat., Technical University of Munich, Germany (1993)
- Occupations: Biophysicist, full-professor at Leipzig University
- Known for: Co-inventor of Optical Stretcher
- Scientific career
- Fields: Soft Matter Physics, Physics of Cancer
- Institutions: Peter Debye Institute for Soft Matter Physics, Faculty of Physics Geosciences, Leipzig University, Germany
- Doctoral advisor: Prof. Dr. Erich Sackmann

Josef A. Käs (born 14 October 1961) is a German biophysicist, currently occupied as a full professor at Leipzig University (German: Universität Leipzig). Josef A. Käs's research mainly focuses on soft matter physics of cancer. More recently (updated in the year of 2023), he has significantly contributed to cancer cell unjamming.

== Life and work ==
Josef Alfons Käs studied at the Technical University of Munich, where he also completed his PhD thesis about the reptation model in polymer physics in 1993. From 1993 to 1996, he was a postdoctoral fellow at Harvard Medical School in the lab of Prof. Paul Janmey, before he became assistant, associate and then full professor at the University of Texas at Austin from 1996 to 2002.

In 2001, Josef A. Käs and Jochen Guck invented the Optical Stretcher, a tool for the contact-free investigation of cell rheology using pure light forces. In the same year, he was also awarded the Wolfgang Paul Award, the highest scientific prize in Germany at that time, by the Alexander von Humboldt Foundation of the Alexander von Humboldt Foundation Consequently, he became full professor at Leipzig University in 2002 and head of the Institute for Experimental Physics I in 2008 (until 2016).

He is one of the organizers of the annual Physics of Cancer conferences in Leipzig and co-founder of RS Zelltechnik, a company that made optical stretchers commercially available.

== Current Position(s) ==
Since 2002, Josef has held the position of a full professor (C4) at the Faculty of Physics and Geosciences at Leipzig University, Germany. Simultaneously, he has been heading the Division for Soft Matter Physics
