= Radiochromic film =

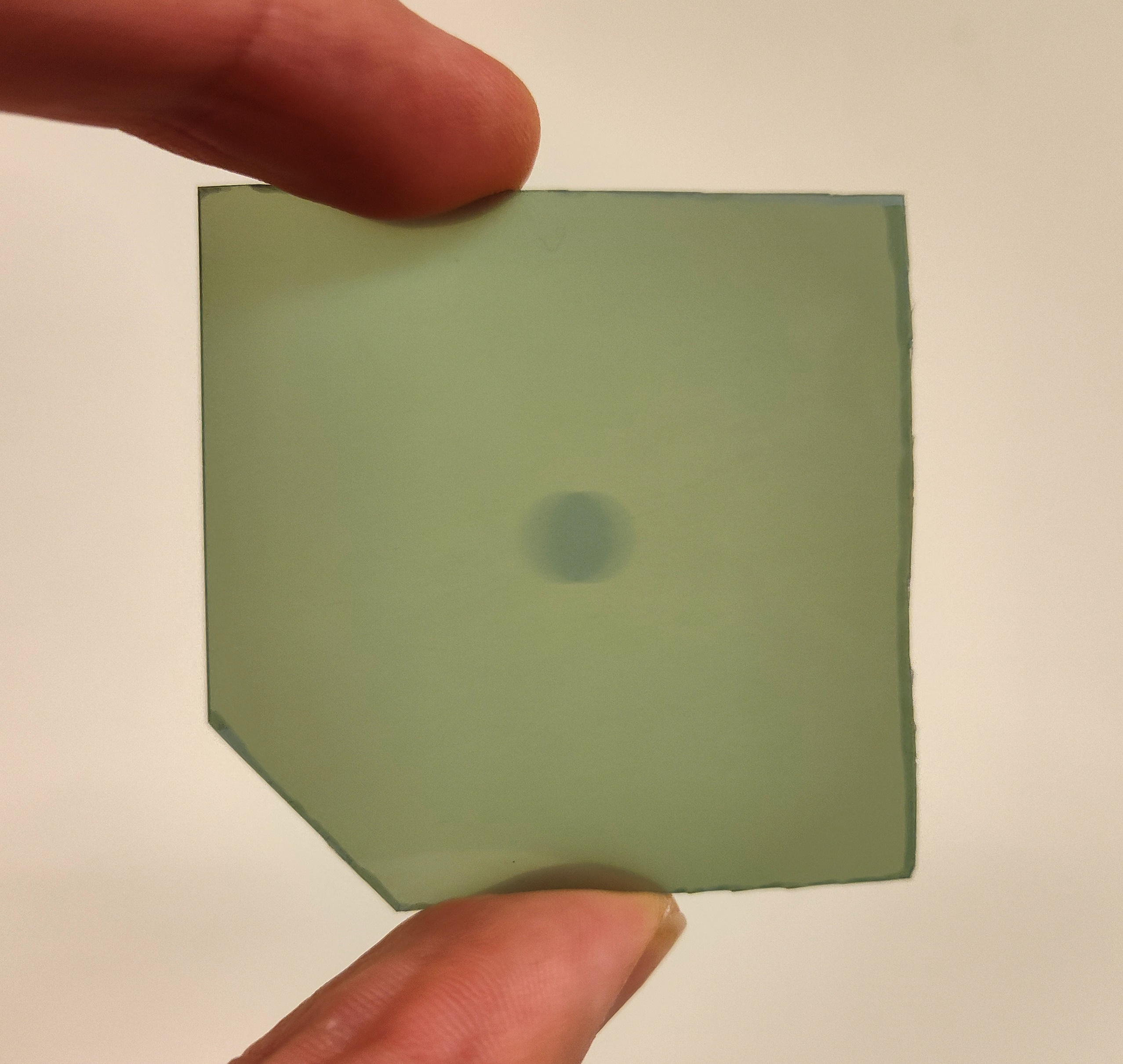
A piece of radiochromic film that has been exposed to a beam of X-rays (n.b., center dark spot)

Radiochromic film is a type of self-developing film typically used in the testing and characterisation of radiographic equipment such as CT scanners and radiotherapy linacs. The film contains a dye which changes colour when exposed to ionising radiation, allowing the level of exposure and beam profile to be characterised. Unlike X-ray film, no developing process is required and results can be obtained almost instantly, while also being insensitive to visible light (making handling easier).

== Mechanism ==
For medical dosimetry "gafchromic dosimetry film ... is arguably the most widely used commercial product." Several types of gafchromic film are marketed with differing properties. One type, MD-55, is made up of layers of polyester substrate with active emulsion layers adhered (approximately 16 μm thick). The active layer consists of polycrystalline, substituted-diacetylene, with the colour change occurring due to "progressive 1,4-trans additions as polyconjugations along the ladder-like polymer chains."

== Usage ==
Radiochromic films have been in general use since the late 1960s, although the general principle has been known about since the 19th century.

=== Profiling ===
Radiochromic film can provide high spatial resolution of ionising radiation. Depending on the scanning technique, sub-millimetre resolution can be achieved.

=== Dosimetry ===
Unlike many other types of radiation detector, radiochromic film can be used for absolute dosimetry where information about absorbed dose is needed. It is typically scanned (e.g., using a standard flatbed scanner) to quantify optical density and therefore degree of exposure. Gafchromic film has been shown to provide measurements accurate to within 2% of absorbed doses in the range of 0.2–100 Gy.
