= International Organization for Medical Physics =

Professional organisation founded in 1963

- IOMP logo
- Abbreviation: IOMP
- Formation: 1963
- Headquarters: York
- Region served: Global
- Official language: English
- President: John Damilakis
- Vice-President: Eva Bezak
- Past President: Madan Rehani
- Secretary-General: Magdalena Stoeva
- Website: www.iomp.org

The International Organization for Medical Physics (IOMP) is a professional organization for medical physics with nearly 22,000 members in 84 countries.

== Objectives and history ==
IOMP is charged with a mission to advance medical physics practice worldwide by disseminating scientific and technical information, fostering the educational and professional development of medical physics and promoting the highest quality medical services for patients.

IOMP was formed in January 1963 initially with 4 affiliated national member organizations (Canada, Sweden, UK, USA). Its first female president, Azam Niroomand-Rad, served from 2003-6 and oversaw expanded support for international education and opportunities for professional recognition.

50 years after its founding, IOMP had a membership of 80 national member organizations and 6 regional organizations. IOMP is affiliated to IUPESM, IUPAP and ICSU and is officially connected to IFMBE.

IOMP collaborates with professional bodies such as IRPA and ICRP and international organizations such as WHO and IAEA in promoting the development of medical physics and safe use of radiation and radiological equipment technology.

IOMP publishes an electronic Newsletter (Medical Physics World) and an open-source journal (Medical Physics International).

To raise awareness about the role medical physicists play for the benefit of patients, IOMP organizes the annual International Day of Medical Physics (IDMP) on November 7 - the birthday of Marie Sklodowska-Curie.

The World Congress on Medical Physics and Biomedical Engineering (World Congress) is organised by IOMP (together with IFMBE and IUPESM) as well as the International Congress of Medical Physics (ICMP), held between World Congresses.

== IOMP member countries ==
State	Member Organisation	Date of membership
Australia	Australasian College of Physical Scientists and Engineers in Medicine (ACPSEM)	
Canada	Canadian Organization of Medical Physicists (COMP)	1963
Sweden	Swedish Society of Radiation Physics	1963
UK	Institute of Physics and Engineering in Medicine (IPEM)	1963
USA	American Association of Physicists in Medicine (AAPM)	1963
Germany	Deutsche Gesellschaft für Medizinische Physik (DGMP)	
Romania	Romanian College of Medical Physicists (CFMR)	1990 (renewed 2010)
Moldova	Association of Medical Physicists from the Republic of Moldova (AFMM)	2016
New Zealand	Australasian College of Physical Scientists and Engineers in Medicine (ACPSEM)	
Denmark	Danish Society for Medical Physics (DSMF)	1982
Hungary
Israel
Poland
South Africa
Brazil
Finland
France
Greece
Mexico
Netherlands
Ireland
Norway
Italy
Japan
Spain
Austria
Belgium
India
Switzerland	Schweizerische Gesellschaft für Strahlenbiologie und Medizinische Physik; Société Suisse de Radiobiologie et de Physique Médicale; Società Svizzera di Radiobiologia e di Fisica Medica; Swiss Society of Radiobiology and Medical Physics (SGSMP-SSRPM-SSRFM-SSRMP)	1982
Thailand
China
Colombia
Nigeria
Turkey
Hong Kong
Philippine
Sri Lanka
Malaysia
Cyprus
Argentina
Bulgaria
Ghana
Korea
Tanzania
Pakistan
Russia	Association of Medical Physicists in Russia (AMPR)	1993
Slovenia
Sudan
Trinidad & Tobago
Algeria
Indonesia
Iran
Panama
Venezuela
Zimbabwe
Cuba
Estonia
Georgia
Lithuania
Morocco
Ukraine
Zambia
Ecuador
Portugal
Bangladesh
Chile
Egypt
Nepal
Taiwan
Singapore
Uganda
Mongolia
Jordan
Croatia
Cameroon
Czech Republic
United Arab Emirates
Macedonia
Lebanon
Peru
Saudi Arabia
Vietnam
Iraq
Qatar

Countries are represented by the respective National Organizations for Medical Physics.

== Regional organizations ==
- European Federation of Organisations for Medical Physics (EFOMP)
- Asia-Oceania Federation of Organizations for Medical Physics (AFOMP)
- Latin American Medical Physics Association (ALFIM)
- Southeast Asian Federation of Organizations of Medical Physics (SEAFOMP)
- Federation of African Medical Physics Organisations (FAMPO)
- Middle East Federation of Organisations for Medical Physics (MEFOMP)

== See also ==
- Medical physics
- World Radiography Day
