= American Association of Physicists in Medicine =

Professional organization in the United States

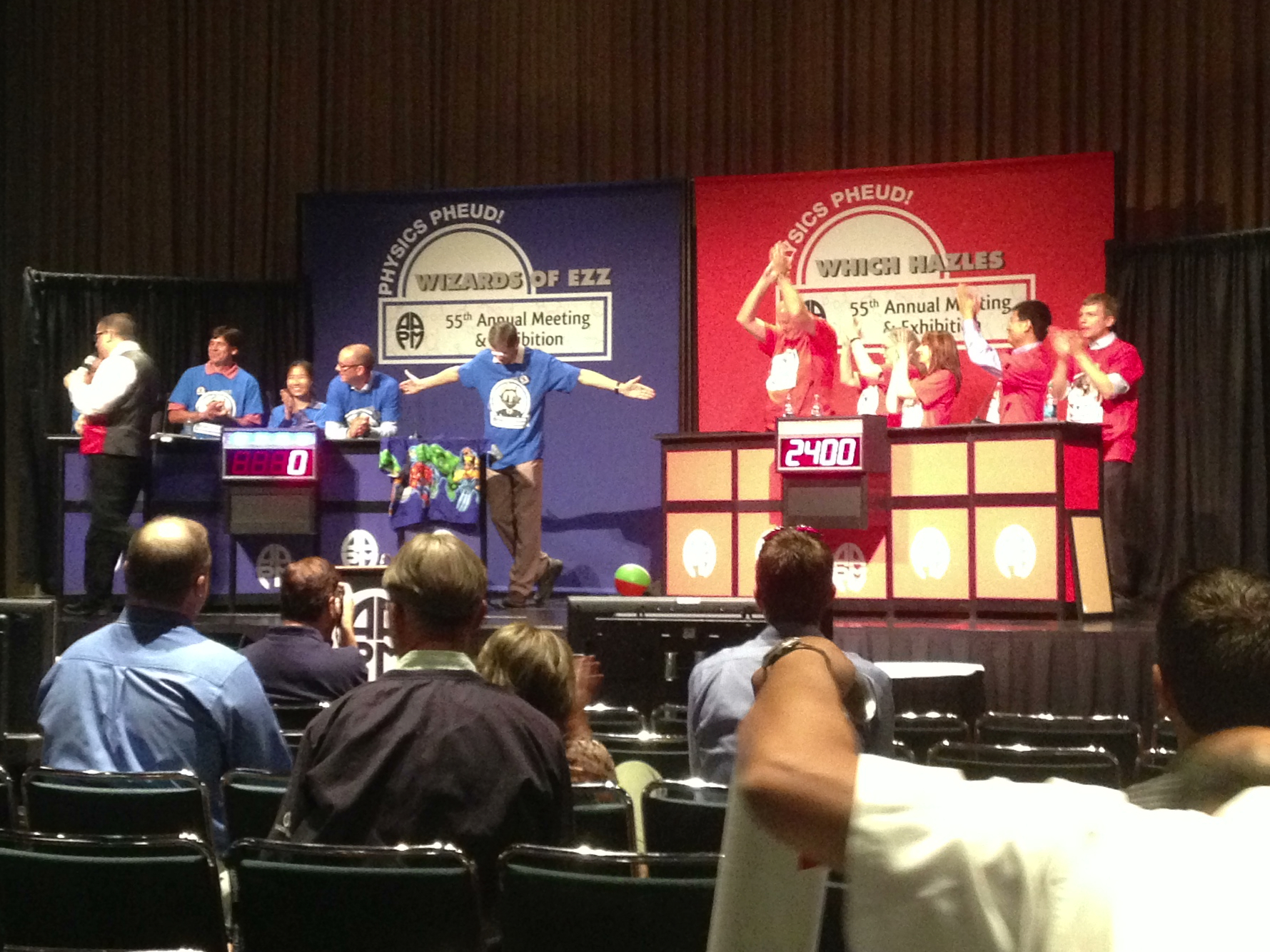
The annual "Physics Pheud", at the 55th AAPM Meeting in Indianapolis in 2013.

The American Association of Physicists in Medicine (AAPM) is a scientific, educational, and professional organization of medical physicists. In 2011, it absorbed the American College of Medical Physics.

Their headquarters are located at 1631 Prince Street, Alexandria, Virginia.

Publications include two scientific journals: Medical Physics and the Journal of Applied Clinical Medical Physics (JACMP), as well as technical reports, and symposium proceedings.

The purposes of the American Association of Physicists in Medicine are to promote the application of physics to medicine and biology and to encourage interest and training in medical physics and related fields. AAPM has established Medical Physics as its primary scientific and informational journal.

AAPM is a Member of the American Institute of Physics and has over 9700 members.

Regional chapters of the AAPM hold regular scientific meetings for their members. For example the New England Chapter typically meets three times per year. More information for the NEAAPM can be found at .

== See also ==
- American Board of Science in Nuclear Medicine
- Institute of Physics and Engineering in Medicine
