= International Union for Physical and Engineering Sciences in Medicine =

International Union for Physical and Engineering Sciences in Medicine (IUPESM)
- International Union for Physical and Engineering Sciences in Medicine (IUPESM)
- Abbreviation: IUPESM
- Formation: 1980; 46 years ago
- Headquarters: Ottawa, Canada (until 2018); York, United Kingdom (since 2018)
- Region served: Global
- Official language: English
- President: James C.H. Goh, PhD
- Parent organization: International Science Council
- Website: IUPESM Official website

The International Union for Physical and Engineering Sciences in Medicine (IUPESM) is an international non-governmental organization - the umbrella organization for the International Organization for Medical Physics (IOMP) and International Federation of Medical and Biological Engineering (IFMBE).

IUPESM was established in 1980, following a discussion during the Combined Meeting of the 12th International Conference on Medical and Biological Engineering and 5th International Conference on Medical Physics held in Jerusalem in 1979. In 1983 IUPESM became an associate member and in 1999 a full member of the International Science Council (former International Council for Science, ICSU).

== International Federation of Medical and Biological Engineering (IFMBE) ==
The International Federation for Medical and Biological Engineering (IFMBE) is a federation of national and transnational societies.

== Health and Technology journal ==
Health and Technology is the official journal of the IUPESM.
