= Institute of Physics and Engineering in Medicine =

United Kingdom professional body

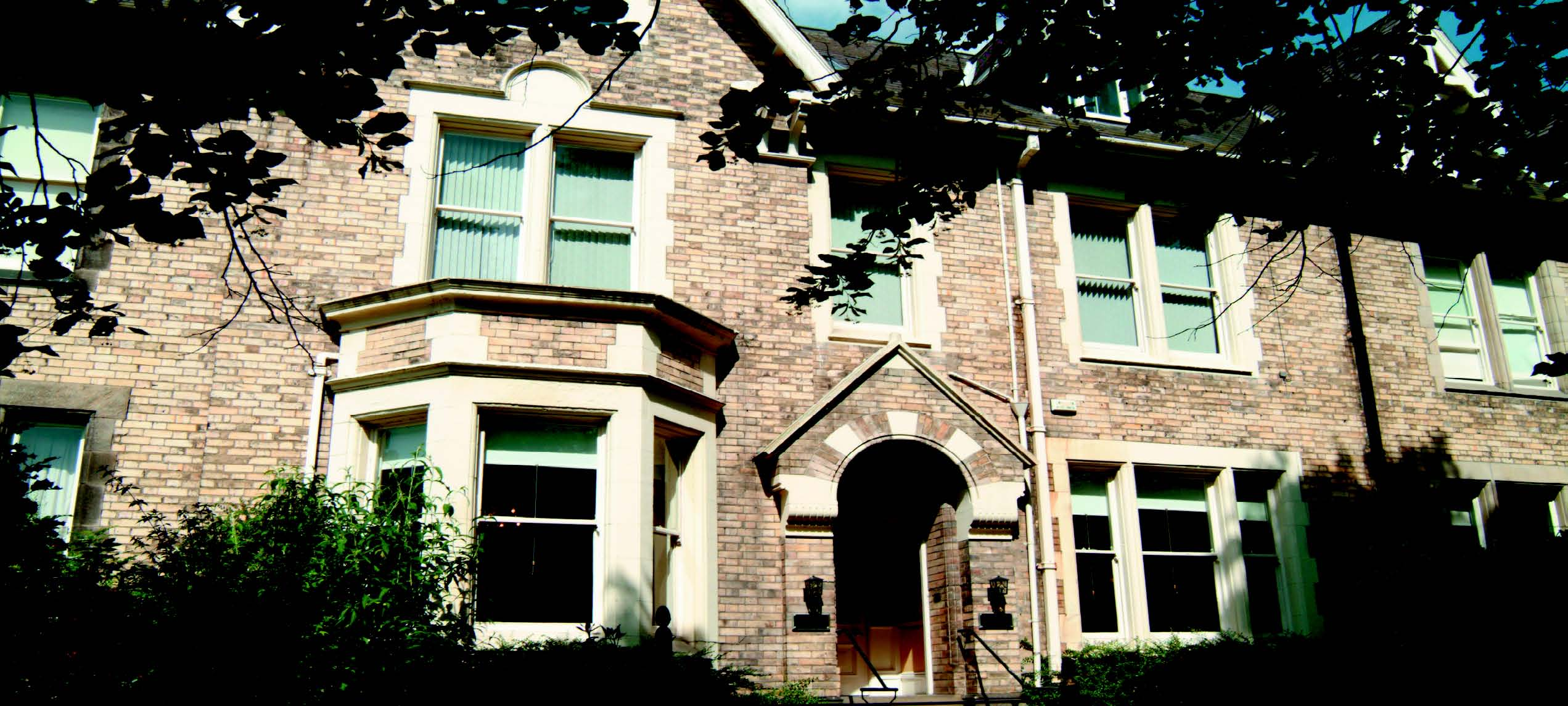
- Fairmount House in York
- Formation: 1997 (1943)
- Type: Learned society
- Headquarters: Fairmount House, 230 Tadcaster Road, York, YO24 1ES, England
- Location: United Kingdom
- Coordinates: 53.9483429°N 1.1008885°W
- Members: 4,700
- Official language: English
- President: Dr Anna Barnes
- Key people: Philip Morgan
- Staff: 22
- Website: www.ipem.ac.uk

The Institute of Physics and Engineering in Medicine (IPEM) is the United Kingdom's professional body and learned society for physicists, engineers and technologists within the field of medicine, founded in 1995, changing its name from the Institution of Physics and Engineering in Medicine and Biology (IPEMB) in 1997. The Institute is governed by an elected Board of Trustees reporting to which are the Science, Research and Innovation Council and the Professional and Standards Council. The councils have operational responsibility for scientific and professional aspects of the Institute's work, respectively. Beneath the councils is a substructure of committees, groups and panels of members, which undertake the work of the Institute.

The Institute is licensed by the Engineering Council to register Chartered Engineers, Incorporated Engineers and Engineering Technologists and by the Science Council to register Chartered Scientists, Registered Scientists and Registered Science Technicians.

The aim of the Institute and its members, set out in its charitable objects and articles of association, is to promote for the public benefit the advancement of physics and engineering applied to medicine and biology, and to advance public education in the field.

== History ==
The organization can trace its origin to three societies:

- the Hospital Physicists Association (HPA) founded in 1943,
- the Hospital Physics Technicians Association (HPTA) founded in 1952, and
- the Biological Engineering Society (BES) founded in 1960.

The HPA created its scientific arm in 1984, the Institute of Physical Sciences in Medicine (IPSM). The trade union and scientific activities split in 1989: the scientific arm merged with the BES to form IPEMB while the trade union (HPA) joined the Manufacturing, Science and Finance Trades Union (MSF). The Association of Medical Technologists (AMT), formerly HPTA, merged with IPEM in 2001.

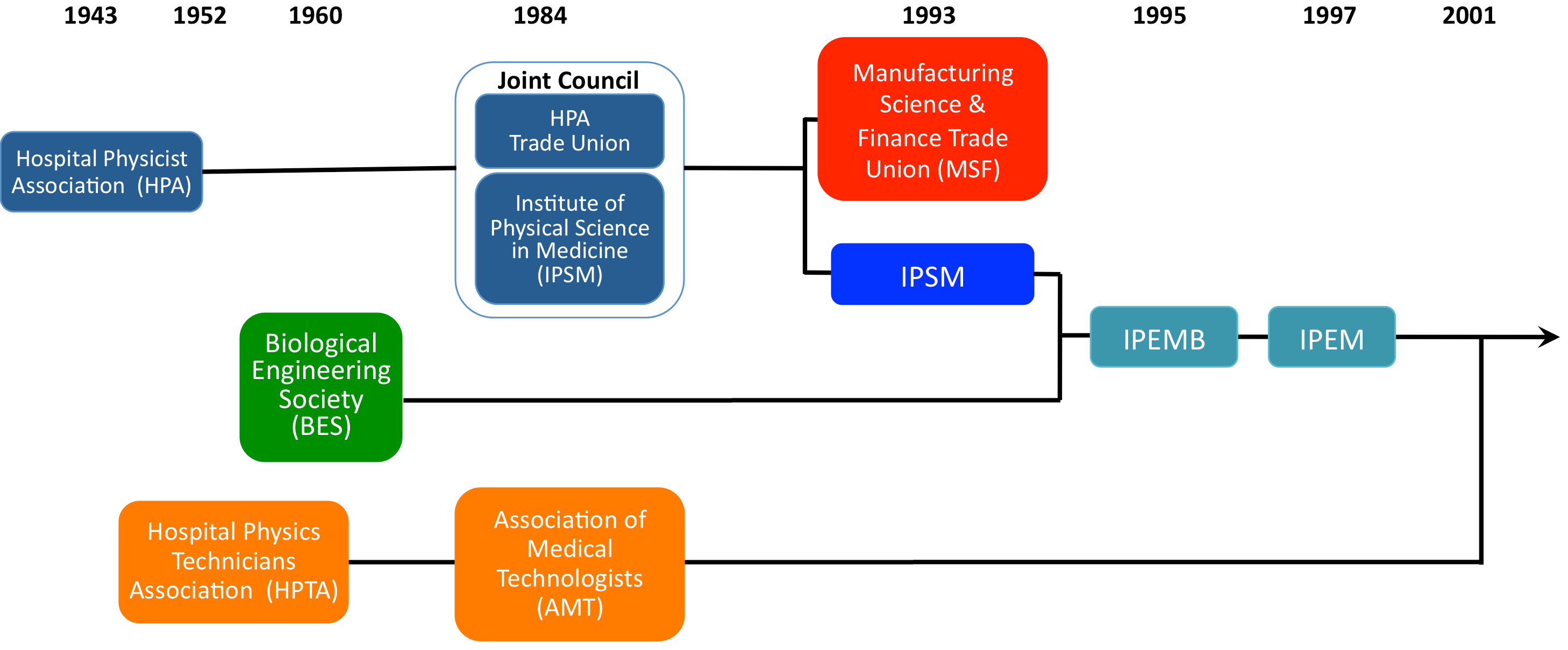
IPEM timeline

== Membership ==
There are several categories of membership:

- Fellowship (FIPEM): This is the most senior category of membership. It is only awarded to Full Members (MIPEM) who have made an outstanding contribution to Medical Physics or Engineering.
- Full Membership (MIPEM): This category is for people seeking recognition as professional Scientists, Engineers or Technologist in the field of Medical Physics or Engineering. It includes the old Incorporated Membership.
- Associate Membership: For people working in the relevant area including STP trainees. Postgraduate students and apprentices in an appropriate field are eligible for free Associate Membership
- Professional Affiliate Membership: For professionals who are working with applications of physics and engineering applied to medicine but who are working as professionals other than clinical scientists or clinical/biomedical engineers e.g. doctors, radiographers, nurses, vets and dentists.
- Affiliate Membership: For anyone with an interest in Medical Physics and Engineering. Full-time undergraduate students are eligible for free Affiliate Membership
- Honorary Fellowship is awarded for outstanding contributions in the field of physics or engineering applied to medicine or related biological science.
- Company Membership
- Dual Membership with the Institute of Physics allows a 25% discount on membership subscriptions payable to each organisation for those who are or become individual members of both organisations.

== Equality, diversity and inclusion ==
The Institute is a signatory of the Engineering Diversity Concordat of the Royal Academy of Engineering and the Science Council Diversity Declaration and has its own Equality Policy.

== Annual Conference and Woolmer Lecture ==
The Institute holds an annual conference on Medical Physics and Engineering. During this conference the flagship lecture of the Institute, the Woolmer Lecture, is presented. The lecture is dedicated to Professor Ronald Woolmer who was the first Director of the Research Department of Anaesthetics at the Royal College of Surgeons. Woolmer convened a meeting at the Royal College of Surgeons, London, to discuss the evolving field of engineering applied to medicine. It was agreed that the group should hold regular meetings and as a result the Biological Engineering Society (BES) was formed with Ronald Woolmer as the first President. Woolmer died two years after the formation of the BES and it was agreed that a memorial lecture would be sponsored in recognition of his achievements.
The following table includes a list of the lectures since 2002:

Year	Lecturer	Subject
2002	Professor Anthony Unsworth	Hip Joint Replacement
2003	Dr Arun Holden	Computational Modelling in Medicine and Biology
2004	Professor Kevin Warwick	Implant Technology
2005	Dr Henrik Gollee	Assistive technologies for function restoration
2006	Professor Denis Noble	Cardiac Modelling
2007	Professor Sir Michael Brady	Digital Imaging
2008	Professor Clive Hahn	Bioengineering Aspects of the Lung: Models and Measurements
2009	Professor Martin Birchall	Regenerative Medicine: New challenges, new hopes
2010	Professor Mark Tooley	Imitating the Patient
2011	Professor Willi Kalender	Developments in Computed Tomography: Is sub-mSv a realistic option?
2012	Professor Lionel Tarassenko	Physiology-Driven Signal Analysis and Data
2013	Professor Molly Stevens	Designing Biomaterials for Ultrasensitive Biosensing and Regenerative Medicine
2014	Professor David Keating	Medical Physics: A Gateway to Innovation
2015	Professor Tony Barker	Transcranial Magnetic Stimulation – the First Thirty Years
2016	Professor Andrew Taylor	Can engineering and imaging help us design cardiovascular devices?
2017	Professor Josef Käs	Why do rigid tumours contain soft cancer cells?
2018	Professor Alison Noble	Human Image Recognition, Artificial Intelligence and Shifting Perceptions of Medical Ultrasound

== Publications ==
IPEM owns three international peer-reviewed journals:

- Physics in Medicine and Biology (PMB)
- Medical Engineering and Physics
- Physiological Measurement

PMB and Physiological Measurement are published in association with IOP Publishing while Medical Engineering and Physics is published by Elsevier.
The Institute also publishes:

- SCOPE – The Institute's quarterly magazine which is free to members and non-members.
- a report series
- educational and teaching material
- a comprehensive e-book programme jointly with IOP Publishing

== President of IPEM ==
The IPEM president serves for two years and takes office at the Annual Conference. The following table includes a list of all past presidents of IPEMB/IPEM.

Dates	President
1995–97	Prof Peter N.T. Wells CBE
1997–99	Prof P. F. Sharp OBE
1999–2001	Prof R.H. Smallwood
2001–03	Dr S.W. Smye OBE
2003–05	Prof P.C. Williams
2005–07	Dr P.C. Jackson
2007–09	Dr K.T. Ison OBE
2009–11	Dr C.J. Gibson
2011–13	Prof P.H. Jarritt
2013–15	Prof S.F. Keevil
2015–17	Prof D. Brettle
2017–19	Prof M. Tooley
2019–21	Prof. Stephen O'Connor
2021–23	Dr Robert Farley
2023–25	Dr Anna Barnes
