= Medical physics =

Application of physics in medicine or healthcare

Medical physics deals with the application of the concepts and methods of physics to the prevention, diagnosis and treatment of human diseases with a specific goal of improving human health and well-being. Since 2008, medical physics has been included as a health profession according to International Standard Classification of Occupation of the International Labour Organization.

Although medical physics may sometimes also be referred to as biomedical physics, medical biophysics, applied physics in medicine, physics applications in medical science, radiological physics or hospital radio-physics, a "medical physicist" is specifically a health professional with specialist education and training in the concepts and techniques of applying physics in medicine and competent to practice independently in one or more of the subfields of medical physics. Traditionally, medical physicists are found in the following healthcare specialties: radiation oncology (also known as radiotherapy or radiation therapy), diagnostic and interventional radiology (also known as medical imaging), nuclear medicine, and radiation protection. Medical physics of radiation therapy can involve work such as dosimetry, linac quality assurance, and brachytherapy. Medical physics of diagnostic and interventional radiology involves medical imaging techniques such as magnetic resonance imaging, ultrasound, computed tomography and x-ray. Nuclear medicine will include positron emission tomography, Single-photon emission computed tomography, and radionuclide therapy. However one can find Medical Physicists in many other areas such as physiological monitoring, audiology, neurology, neurophysiology, cardiology and others.

Medical physics departments may be found in institutions such as universities, hospitals, and laboratories. University departments are of two types. The first type are mainly concerned with preparing students for a career as a clinical Medical Physicist and research focuses on improving the practice of the profession. A second type (increasingly called 'biomedical physics') has a much wider scope and may include research in any applications of physics to medicine from the study of biomolecular structure to microscopy and nanomedicine.

== Mission statement of medical physicists ==
In hospital medical physics departments, the mission statement for medical physicists as adopted by the European Federation of Organisations for Medical Physics (EFOMP) is the following:

Medical Physicists will contribute to maintaining and improving the quality, safety and cost-effectiveness of healthcare services through patient-oriented activities requiring expert action, involvement or advice regarding the specification, selection, acceptance testing, commissioning, quality assurance/control and optimised clinical use of medical devices and regarding patient risks and protection from associated physical agents (e.g., x-rays, electromagnetic fields, laser light, radionuclides) including the prevention of unintended or accidental exposures; all activities will be based on current best evidence or own scientific research when the available evidence is not sufficient. The scope includes risks to volunteers in biomedical research, carers and comforters. The scope often includes risks to workers and public particularly when these impact patient risk

The term "physical agents" refers to ionising and non-ionising electromagnetic radiations, static electric and magnetic fields, ultrasound, laser light and any other Physical Agent associated with medical e.g., x-rays in computerised tomography (CT), gamma rays/radionuclides in nuclear medicine, magnetic fields and radio-frequencies in magnetic resonance imaging (MRI), ultrasound in ultrasound imaging and Doppler measurements.

This mission includes the following 11 key activities:

1. Scientific problem solving service: Comprehensive problem solving service involving recognition of less than optimal performance or optimised use of medical devices, identification and elimination of possible causes or misuse, and confirmation that proposed solutions have restored device performance and use to acceptable status. All activities are to be based on current best scientific evidence or own research when the available evidence is not sufficient.
2. Dosimetry measurements: Measurement of doses had by patients, volunteers in biomedical research, carers, comforters and persons subjected to non-medical imaging exposures (e.g., for legal or employment purposes); selection, calibration and maintenance of dosimetry related instrumentation; independent checking of dose related quantities provided by dose reporting devices (including software devices); measurement of dose related quantities required as inputs to dose reporting or estimating devices (including software). Measurements to be based on current recommended techniques and protocols. Includes dosimetry of all physical agents.
3. Patient safety/risk management (including volunteers in biomedical research, carers, comforters and persons subjected to non-medical imaging exposures. Surveillance of medical devices and evaluation of clinical protocols to ensure the ongoing protection of patients, volunteers in biomedical research, carers, comforters and persons subjected to non-medical imaging exposures from the deleterious effects of physical agents in accordance with the latest published evidence or own research when the available evidence is not sufficient. Includes the development of risk assessment protocols.
4. Occupational and public safety/risk management (when there is an impact on medical exposure or own safety). Surveillance of medical devices and evaluation of clinical protocols with respect to protection of workers and public when impacting the exposure of patients, volunteers in biomedical research, carers, comforters and persons subjected to non-medical imaging exposures or responsibility with respect to own safety. Includes the development of risk assessment protocols in conjunction with other experts involved in occupational / public risks.
5. Clinical medical device management: Specification, selection, acceptance testing, commissioning and quality assurance/ control of medical devices in accordance with the latest published European or International recommendations and the management and supervision of associated programmes. Testing to be based on current recommended techniques and protocols.
6. Clinical involvement: Carrying out, participating in and supervising everyday radiation protection and quality control procedures to ensure ongoing effective and optimised use of medical radiological devices and including patient specific optimization.
7. Development of service quality and cost-effectiveness: Leading the introduction of new medical radiological devices into clinical service, the introduction of new medical physics services and participating in the introduction/development of clinical protocols/techniques whilst giving due attention to economic issues.
8. Expert consultancy: Provision of expert advice to outside clients (e.g., clinics with no in-house medical physics expertise).
9. Education of healthcare professionals (including medical physics trainees: Contributing to quality healthcare professional education through knowledge transfer activities concerning the technical-scientific knowledge, skills and competences supporting the clinically effective, safe, evidence-based and economical use of medical radiological devices. Participation in the education of medical physics students and organisation of medical physics residency programmes.
10. Health technology assessment (HTA): Taking responsibility for the physics component of health technology assessments related to medical radiological devices and /or the medical uses of radioactive substances/sources.
11. Innovation: Developing new or modifying existing devices (including software) and protocols for the solution of hitherto unresolved clinical problems.

== Medical biophysics and biomedical physics ==
A ribosome is a biological machine that utilizes protein domain dynamics, leading Richard Feynman to suggest a medical use for nanophysics

Some education institutions house departments or programs bearing the title "medical biophysics" or "biomedical physics" or "applied physics in medicine". Generally, these fall into one of two categories: interdisciplinary departments that house biophysics, radiobiology, and medical physics under a single umbrella; and undergraduate programs that prepare students for further study in medical physics, biophysics, or medicine. Most of the scientific concepts in bionanotechnology are derived from other fields. Biochemical principles that are used to understand the material properties of biological systems are central in bionanotechnology because those same principles are to be used to create new technologies. Material properties and applications studied in bionanoscience include mechanical properties (e.g. deformation, adhesion, failure), electrical/electronic (e.g. electromechanical stimulation, capacitors, energy storage/batteries), optical (e.g. absorption, luminescence, photochemistry), thermal (e.g. thermomutability, thermal management), biological (e.g. how cells interact with nanomaterials, molecular flaws/defects, biosensing, biological mechanisms such as mechanosensation), nanoscience of disease (e.g. genetic disease, cancer, organ/tissue failure), as well as computing (e.g. DNA computing) and agriculture (target delivery of pesticides, hormones and fertilizers.

== Areas of specialty ==
The International Organization for Medical Physics (IOMP) recognizes main areas of medical physics employment and focus.

=== Medical imaging physics ===
Para-sagittal MRI of the head in a patient with benign familial macrocephaly.

Medical imaging physics is also known as diagnostic and interventional radiology physics. Clinical (both "in-house" and "consulting") physicists typically deal with areas of testing, optimization, and quality assurance of diagnostic radiology physics areas such as radiographic X-rays, fluoroscopy, mammography, angiography, and computed tomography, as well as non-ionizing radiation modalities such as ultrasound, and MRI. They may also be engaged with radiation protection issues such as dosimetry (for staff and patients). In addition, many imaging physicists are often also involved with nuclear medicine systems, including single photon emission computed tomography (SPECT) and positron emission tomography (PET). Sometimes, imaging physicists may be engaged in clinical areas, but for research and teaching purposes, such as quantifying intravascular ultrasound as a possible method of imaging a particular vascular object.

=== Therapeutic medical physics ===
Radiation therapeutic physics is also known as radiotherapy physics or radiation oncologist physics. The majority of medical physicists currently working in the US, Canada, and some western countries are of this group. A radiation therapy physicist typically deals with linear accelerator (Linac) systems and kilovoltage x-ray treatment units on a daily basis, as well as other modalities such as TomoTherapy, gamma knife, Cyberknife, proton therapy, and brachytherapy. The academic and research side of therapeutic physics may encompass fields such as boron neutron capture therapy, sealed source radiotherapy, terahertz radiation, high-intensity focused ultrasound (including lithotripsy), optical radiation lasers, ultraviolet etc. including photodynamic therapy, as well as nuclear medicine including unsealed source radiotherapy, and photomedicine, which is the use of light to treat and diagnose disease.

=== Nuclear medicine physics ===
Nuclear medicine is a branch of medicine that uses radiation to provide information about the functioning of a person's specific organs or to treat disease. The thyroid, bones, heart, liver and many other organs can be easily imaged, and disorders in their function revealed. In some cases radiation sources can be used to treat diseased organs, or tumours. Five Nobel laureates have been intimately involved with the use of radioactive tracers in medicine. Over 10,000 hospitals worldwide use radioisotopes in medicine, and about 90% of the procedures are for diagnosis. The most common radioisotope used in diagnosis is technetium-99m, with some 30 million procedures per year, accounting for 80% of all nuclear medicine procedures worldwide.

=== Health physics ===
Health physics is also known as radiation safety or radiation protection. Health physics is the applied physics of radiation protection for health and health care purposes. It is the science concerned with the recognition, evaluation, and control of health hazards to permit the safe use and application of ionizing radiation. Health physics professionals promote excellence in the science and practice of radiation protection and safety.

- Background radiation
- Radiation protection
- Dosimetry
- Health physics
- Radiological protection of patients

=== Non-ionizing medical radiation physics ===
Some aspects of non-ionizing radiation physics may be considered under radiation protection or diagnostic imaging physics. Imaging modalities include MRI, optical imaging and ultrasound. Safety considerations include these areas and lasers

- Lasers and applications in medicine

=== Physiological measurement ===
Physiological measurements have also been used to monitor and measure various physiological parameters. Many physiological measurement techniques are non-invasive and can be used in conjunction with, or as an alternative to, other invasive methods. Measurement methods include electrocardiography Many of these areas may be covered by other specialities, for example medical engineering or vascular science.

=== Healthcare informatics and computational physics ===
Other closely related fields to medical physics include fields which deal with medical data, information technology and computer science for medicine.

- Information and communication in medicine
- Medical informatics
- Image processing, display and visualization
- Computer-aided diagnosis
- Picture archiving and communication systems (PACS)
- Standards: DICOM, ISO, IHE
- Hospital information systems
- e-Health
- Telemedicine
- Digital operating room
- Workflow, patient-specific modeling
- Medicine on the Internet of Things
- Distant monitoring and telehomecare

=== Areas of research and academic development ===
ECG trace

Non-clinical physicists may or may not focus on the above areas from an academic and research point of view, but their scope of specialization may also encompass lasers and ultraviolet systems (such as photodynamic therapy), fMRI and other methods for functional imaging as well as molecular imaging, electrical impedance tomography, diffuse optical imaging, optical coherence tomography, and dual energy X-ray absorptiometry.

== Legislative and advisory bodies ==
=== International ===
- ICRU: International Commission on Radiation Units and Measurements
- ICRP: International Commission on Radiological Protection
- IOMP: International Organization for Medical Physics
- IAEA: International Atomic Energy Agency

=== United States of America ===
- NCRP: National Council on Radiation Protection & Measurements
- NRC: Nuclear Regulatory Commission
- FDA: Food and Drug Administration
- AAPM: American Association of Physicists in Medicine

=== United Kingdom ===
- IPEM: Institute of Physics and Engineering in Medicine
- MHRA: Medicines and Healthcare products Regulatory Agency

=== Other ===
- AMPI: Association of Medical Physicists of India
- CCPM: Canadian College of Physicists in Medicine
- EFOMP: European Federation of Organisations for Medical Physics
- ACPSEM: Australasian College of Physical Scientists and Engineers in Medicine
