= Patrick D. Barnes =

American pediatric radiologist and neuroradiologist

Patrick Barnes
- Born: 1948 (age 77–78); Oklahoma City
- Education: University of Oklahoma; Harvard Medical School
- Scientific career
- Workplaces: Boston Children's Hospital; University of Oklahoma; Harvard Medical School; Stanford School of Medicine

Patrick Barnes (born February 3, 1948) is an American pediatric radiologist and pediatric neuroradiologist. He is Emeritus Professor of Radiology at the Stanford School of Medicine. He also has served as the Chief of the Section of Pediatric Neuroradiology and the Inaugural Director of the Pediatric MRI and CT Center at Lucile Packard Children's Hospital. He is known for his contributions to the field of pediatric neuroradiology, particularly in the development and implementation of magnetic resonance imaging (MRI) for the evaluation of pediatric neurological conditions.

Barnes is a co-founder and past president of the American Society of Pediatric Neuroradiology (ASPNR) and has held leadership roles in various professional societies, including the American Society of Neuroradiology (ASNR) and the Society for Pediatric Radiology (SPR).

== Early life and education ==
Barnes was born in Oklahoma City, Oklahoma. He was valedictorian of his high school class in Vinita, Oklahoma, in 1966. He completed his undergraduate education at the University of Oklahoma, where he studied Letters/Pre-Medicine from 1966 to 1969. He earned his Doctor of Medicine degree from the University of Oklahoma College of Medicine in 1973, graduating with honors and being inducted into the Alpha Omega Alpha Honor Medical Society.

Barnes completed his residency in diagnostic radiology at the University of Oklahoma Health Sciences Center in 1976, followed by a fellowship in pediatric neuroradiology and cardiovascular radiology at Children's Hospital and Harvard Medical School in Boston, Massachusetts. He was subsequently certified by the American Board of Radiology in diagnostic radiology with added qualification in neuroradiology.

== Career ==
After completing his diagnostic radiology residency at the University of Oklahoma College of Medicine (1973–1976), Patrick D. Barnes undertook fellowship training in pediatric neuroradiology and cardiovascular radiology at Boston Children's Hospital and Harvard Medical School (1976–1977). This period marked the beginning of his long-standing academic focus on pediatric and developmental neuroimaging.

In 1976, Barnes joined the faculty of the University of Oklahoma College of Medicine, holding a sequence of academic and teaching appointments from 1976 to 1986. He served as Instructor in Radiology (1976–1977), Assistant Professor of Radiology (1977–1982), and Associate Professor of Radiology (1982–1986). Concurrently, he held appointments as Clinical Assistant Professor of Neurosurgery and contributed to radiologic technology education as a lecturer and adjunct faculty member. At Oklahoma, as lead collaborator of University and Community MRI Programs, Barnes developed early clinical and research expertise in pediatric neuroradiology at a time when advanced cross-sectional neuroimaging was still emerging in routine clinical practice.

In 1987, Barnes moved to Boston to join the faculty of Harvard Medical School, serving as Assistant Professor of Radiology (1987–1992) and later Associate Professor of Radiology (1992–2000). During this period, his clinical and research activities were centered at Boston Children's Hospital, where he played a role in the expansion of pediatric neuroradiology and the early clinical translation of magnetic resonance imaging for neurological disease in children.

In 2000, Barnes joined the Stanford academic medical system as a senior faculty member in the Department of Radiology at Stanford University Medical Center. He was appointed Inaugural Chief of Pediatric Neuroradiology and Inaugural Director of the Pediatric MRI and CT Center at Lucile Packard Children's Hospital Stanford, where he established and led dedicated pediatric neuroimaging services and integrated advanced MRI and CT technologies into routine pediatric, neonatal, and fetal care.

At Stanford and Lucile Packard Children's Hospital, Barnes developed multidisciplinary imaging programs supporting pediatric neurology, neurosurgery, head and neck surgery, vascular anomalies, neuroncology, radiation oncology, neonatal intensive care, and maternal–fetal medicine.

He was a founding leader of institutional initiatives in fetal MRI and advanced neonatal brain imaging and served as a senior imaging consultant for pediatric brain tumor care, image-guided therapy, and clinical research trials. He also co-founded the hospital's Child Abuse SCAN Team, contributing to imaging-based clinical pathways for evaluating suspected child abuse and traumatic brain injury.

Following his retirement from full-time clinical and academic duties, Barnes was appointed Professor of Radiology, Emeritus in Pediatric Radiology and Neuroradiology at Stanford University Medical Center.

Barnes entire clinical, teaching, and research career has been dedicated to the early and ongoing collaborative mentorship and advocacy for diversity of future leaders in the pediatric and radiologic specialties, especially pediatric radiology & neuroradiology, and including radiologists-in-training while also serving in the United States Armed Forces.

== Research and contributions ==
Barnes has authored or co-authored more than 140 peer-reviewed publications spanning pediatric MRI, fetal and neonatal neuroimaging, pediatric neuro-oncology, and childhood trauma imaging. He has contributed chapters to major reference works, including Fetal and Neonatal Brain Injury (Cambridge University Press, 2018), and co-authored widely used training textbooks in pediatric radiology and neuroradiology. Across his career, Barnes has been recognized for pioneering the clinical translation of advanced MRI technologies, leadership in collaborative multicenter research, and sustained mentorship of future leaders in pediatric radiology and pediatric neuroradiology.

=== Development of Pediatric MRI ===
Between 1986 and 2015, Barnes authored or co-authored more than 45 publications on pediatric MRI development. Working with colleagues in Oklahoma, he demonstrated that MRI could be used as a reliable and non-invasive method to screen children for spinal dysraphism, directly contributing to MRI replacing myelography as the standard imaging technique for pediatric spine evaluation.

At Boston Children's Hospital, Barnes and collaborators published the first report using MRI to characterize vascular anomalies in children. This work helped establish MRI as a primary modality for evaluating complex vascular and head and neck conditions in pediatric patients and enabled multidisciplinary models of care. In collaboration with Robert Mulkern, Barnes pioneered rapid imaging techniques using fast spin-echo methods, reducing imaging times and improving feasibility for sedation and anesthesia in children.

These efforts led to one of the first comprehensive textbooks on pediatric neuroradiologic MRI, MRI in Pediatric Neuroradiology (Wolpert & Barnes, Mosby-Year Book, 1992), followed by the widely used training text Pediatric Radiology: The Requisites (Blickman, Parker, & Barnes Elsevier, 2009).

At Stanford, Barnes collaborated with Kristen Yeom and the Roland Bammer research group to introduce advanced diffusion and motion-correction techniques for pediatric brain imaging, further reducing the need for sedation and anesthesia. This work received multiple Caffey Awards for Best Scientific Paper from the Society for Pediatric Radiology.

=== Pediatric Neuro-Oncology Imaging ===
Barnes contributed centrally to the development of MRI-based imaging in pediatric brain tumor care. At Boston Children's Hospital, he collaborated with pediatric oncologists, neurosurgeons, and radiation oncologists, including teams at the Dana Farber Cancer Institute, to establish one of the earliest multidisciplinary Pediatric Brain Tumor Working Groups. This collaboration later contributed to the creation of the Pediatric Brain Tumor Consortium, supported by the National Cancer Institute.

His work demonstrated that MRI should guide craniospinal irradiation planning due to large inter-patient variability in spinal anatomy. Barnes also contributed to early clinical implementation of image-guided stereotactic radiotherapy, enabling more precise targeting of tumors and improved sparing of normal brain tissue. He further established the clinical value of advanced MRI techniques, including MR spectroscopy and perfusion imaging, for distinguishing treatment-related changes and hemorrhage from tumor progression in children. At Lucile Packard Children's Hospital Stanford, Barnes collaborated on studies demonstrating that specific MRI features, including apparent diffusion coefficient patterns, can predict histological subtypes of medulloblastoma.

=== Fetal MRI ===
Barnes played a key role in early clinical development of ultrafast fetal MRI. At Boston Children's Hospital, he collaborated with Deborah Levine of Beth Israel Deaconess Medical Center to establish fetal MRI as a complementary modality when prenatal ultrasound suggested CNS abnormalities.

=== Neonatal Neuroimaging ===
From 1993 to 2021, Barnes authored or co-authored more than 25 publications on neonatal neuroimaging. At Boston Children's Hospital and Brigham and Women's Hospital, he collaborated with neonatal neurology teams led by Joseph Volpe and Petra Hüppi in the early application of diffusion-weighted and diffusion tensor imaging to perinatal brain injury.

Barnes contributed to studies showing that diffusion-based MRI can detect ischemic injury during the narrow therapeutic window when neuroprotective therapies may be effective.

At Stanford, he continued outcome-based neonatal imaging research, including large multicenter investigations with the Eunice Kennedy Shriver National Institute of Child Health and Human Development Neonatal Research Network.

He served as lead pediatric neuroradiology consultant and central image reader for national trials evaluating neuroimaging biomarkers in preterm infants and neonates undergoing therapeutic hypothermia for hypoxic-ischemic encephalopathy.

=== Imaging of Child Trauma and Alleged Abuse ===
Barnes has also been a leading contributor to imaging research in infant and childhood trauma. After serving as a pediatric radiology consultant to child protection teams in Oklahoma and Boston Children's Hospital, he co-founded the Child Abuse SCAN Team at Lucile Packard Children's Hospital Stanford in 2008.

His research focused on advanced MRI and CT techniques for evaluating pediatric head trauma and on the differential diagnosis of non-accidental injury and medical conditions that may mimic abuse.

Barnes published extensively on ethical and evidentiary issues in imaging suspected abuse, arguing that radiologic findings such as subdural hemorrhage, retinal hemorrhage, and encephalopathy cannot reliably establish abuse or its timing in isolation.

== Honors and awards ==
Barnes has received the John A. Kirkpatrick Jr. Faculty Teaching Award from Harvard Medical School, the S.B. Rossiter / Senior Radiology Faculty of the Year Award (x3) from Stanford University Medical Center, and the Herman Grossman Lecturer award from Duke University Medical Center.

From 2012 to 2018, he was recognized as one of America's Top Doctors, ranking in the top 1% of neuroradiologists in the nation by U.S. News & World Report and Castle Connolly Medical.

In 2018, Barnes was honored as Emeritus Professor of Radiology (Pediatric Radiology – Neuroradiology) at Stanford University Medical Center.

== Selected publications ==
- Findley, Keith; Risinger, D.; Barnes, Patrick; Mack, Julie; Moran, David; Scheck, Barry; Bohan, Thomas (1 December 2020). "Feigned Consensus: Usurping the Law in Shaken Baby Syndrome/Abusive Head Trauma Prosecutions". Articles.
- Laptook, Abbot R.; Shankaran, Seetha; Barnes, Patrick (March 2021). "Limitations of Conventional Magnetic Resonance Imaging as a Predictor of Death or Disability Following Neonatal Hypoxic-Ischemic Encephalopathy in the Late Hypothermia Trial". The Journal of Pediatrics. 230: 106–111.e6. doi:10.1016/j.jpeds.2020.11.015. ISSN 1097-6833. PMC 7914162. PMID 33189747.
- Duncan, Andrea F.; Bann, Carla M.; Dempsey, Allison; Peralta-Carcelen, Myriam; Hintz, Susan (January 2019). "Behavioral Deficits at 18-22 Months of Age Are Associated with Early Cerebellar Injury and Cognitive and Language Performance in Children Born Extremely Preterm". The Journal of Pediatrics. 204: 148–156.e4. doi:10.1016/j.jpeds.2018.08.059. ISSN 1097-6833. PMC 6394414. PMID 30292492.
- Li, Matthew D.; Forkert, Nils D.; Kundu, Palak; Ambler, Cheryl; Lober, Robert M.; Burns, Terry C.; Barnes, Patrick D. (July 2018). "Preterm Neuroimaging and School-Age Cognitive Outcomes". Pediatrics. 142 (1): e20174058. doi:10.1542/peds.2017-4058. hdl:1805/19076. ISSN 1098-4275. PMC 6128951. PMID 29945955.
