= American Osteopathic College of Radiology =

- Abbreviation: AOCR
- Formation: 1941
- Type: Professional association
- Headquarters: Milan, MO
- Location: United States
- Official language: English
- President: Frederick White, DO, FAOCR
- President-Elect: Wade Wong, DO, FAOCR
- Vice-President: Michelle Walters, DO, FAOCR
- Secretary: Claire McKay, DO
- Website: aocr.org

The American Osteopathic College of Radiology (AOCR), founded in 1941, is a non-profit professional medical association in the United States representing Doctors of Osteopathic Medicine (D.O.) that specialize in radiology. The AOCR is accredited by the American Osteopathic Association (AOA) and the Accreditation Council for Continuing Medical Education to oversee continuing medical education activities for osteopathic radiologists. The AOCR is one of two professional organizations representing American radiologists, the other organization is the American College of Radiology. The college publishes The Journal of the American Osteopathic College of Radiology (JAOCR).

Certified fellows of the American Osteopathic College of Radiology are eligible to become senior members of the American Society of Neuroradiology in addition to their certified peers from the American Board of Radiology and the Royal College of Physicians and Surgeons of Canada. Additionally, osteopathic radiologists that have completed an ACGME radiology residency or completed an AOA/AOCR-approved residency in diagnostic radiology and subsequent board certification by the American Osteopathic Board of Radiology, may also apply for board certification through the American Board of Radiology.

== See also ==
- American College of Radiology
- American Osteopathic Board of Radiology
