= John Caffey =

American pediatrician and radiologist (1895–1978)

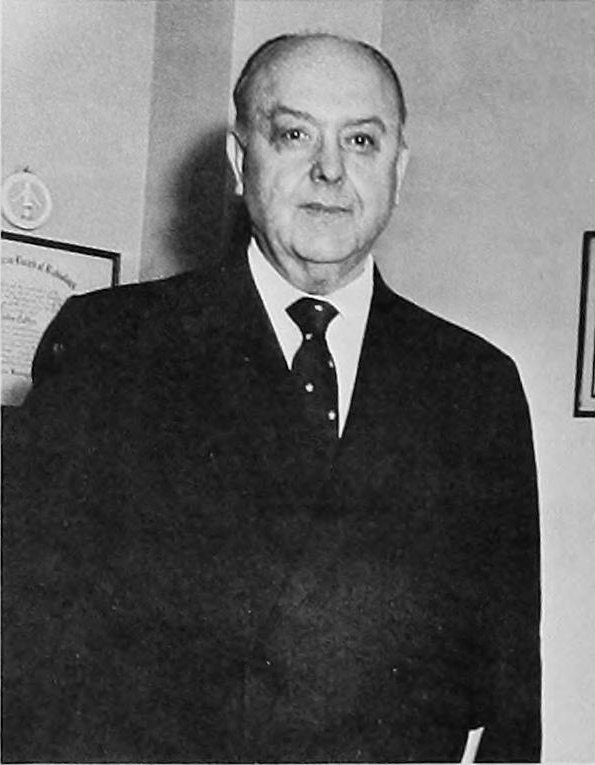
- Caffey c. 1960
- Born: John Patrick Caffey; March 30, 1895; Castle Gate, Utah, U.S.
- Died: September 2, 1978 (aged 83); Presbyterian-University Hospital, Pittsburgh, Pennsylvania, U.S.
- Education: University of Michigan (BA, MD)
- Occupations: Pediatrician; radiologist

John Patrick Caffey (March 30, 1895 – September 2, 1978) was an American pediatrician and radiologist who is often referred to as one of the founders of pediatric radiology. He was the first to describe shaken baby syndrome, infantile cortical hyperostosis, and Kenny-Caffey syndrome.

== Early life ==
Caffey was born on March 30, 1895, in Castle Gate, Utah. He attended school in Salt Lake City, Utah, before enrolling at the University of Michigan, where he completed a Bachelor of Arts in 1916 and a Doctor of Medicine in 1919.

== Career ==
Caffey interned at Barnes Hospital in St. Louis before traveling to postwar Europe in 1920, working with the American Red Cross and American Relief Administration in Serbia, Poland and Russia. He returned to the United States in 1923, completing a residency in medicine at the University of Michigan and then an internship in pediatrics at Babies Hospital in New York City. He opened a private practice in 1925 while maintaining admitting rights at Babies Hospital.

He was given the position of head of radiology at Babies Hospital in 1929 after the chief of pediatrics overheard him complaining about the poor quality of a radiology conference at the hospital. When the chief of pediatrics asked if he could do any better, Caffey replied, "I could try." Pediatric radiology would go on to become his life's work, and he would receive radiographs mailed from across North America for his expert opinion. He was an avid researcher, publishing initially on the effects on the skeletal system of lead poisoning, rickets, bismuth, hemophilia, vitamin A poisoning, syphilis, and hemolytic anemias. He published Pediatric X-Ray Diagnosis, the first definitive textbook on the topic, in 1945. Caffey was the first to describe what is now known as shaken baby syndrome with a 1946 article on the association between long bone fractures and subdural hematomas in infants. He also provided the first description of infantile cortical hyperostosis, also known as Caffey's disease.

At Babies Hospital, Caffey was appointed professor of clinical pediatrics in 1950 and then professor of radiology in 1954. He retired from Babies Hospital in 1960 and joined the Children's Hospital of Pittsburgh in 1963 as a radiologist and a professor at University of Pittsburgh School of Medicine. He continued his research in Pittsburgh, describing the earliest radiological changes of Perthes disease and a new form of dwarfism, termed Kenny-Caffey syndrome.

Caffey was a founding member of the Society for Pediatric Radiology, but was only eligible for the title of honorary counselor as he did not have formal qualifications in radiology. He received the American Medical Association's Jacobi Award; the American Pediatric Society's highest honor, the John Howland Award; and the American College of Radiology's Gold Medal.

== Death and legacy ==
Caffey died on September 2, 1978, at Presbyterian-University Hospital in Pittsburgh. He had continued working up until the morning of his hospital admission. The seventh edition of his textbook was published shortly before his death and, now known as Caffey's Pediatric Diagnostic Imaging, is in its thirteenth edition as of 2021.
