= Mario Maas =

Mario Maas (born 8 September 1961, Amsterdam) is a Dutch professor of radiology, in particular musculoskeletal radiology at the University of Amsterdam and the Academic Medical Centre of Amsterdam.

He started his career at the AMC Amsterdam in 1995. His focus of research includes: joint and tendon disorders, muscle pathology, sports Imaging, bone marrow MRI and bone marrow evaluation in lysosomal storage disorders

He is a member of the editorial board of the European Journal of Radiology.

His first publication was in 1990: (Gubler FM, Maas M, Dijkstra PF, de Jongh HR, "Cystic rheumatoid arthritis: description of a nonerosive form". Radiology); as of September 2013 he has 168 publications registered at ResearchGate and 120 peer-reviewed publications in academic journals such as the American Journal of Sports Medicine, American Journal of Bone and Joint Surgery, Radiology, European Radiology, Skeletal Radiology, Blood Cells, Molecules and Diseases Journal and Paediatric Radiology.
