= Amaka Offiah =

British paediatric radiologist

Professor Amaka C. Offiah
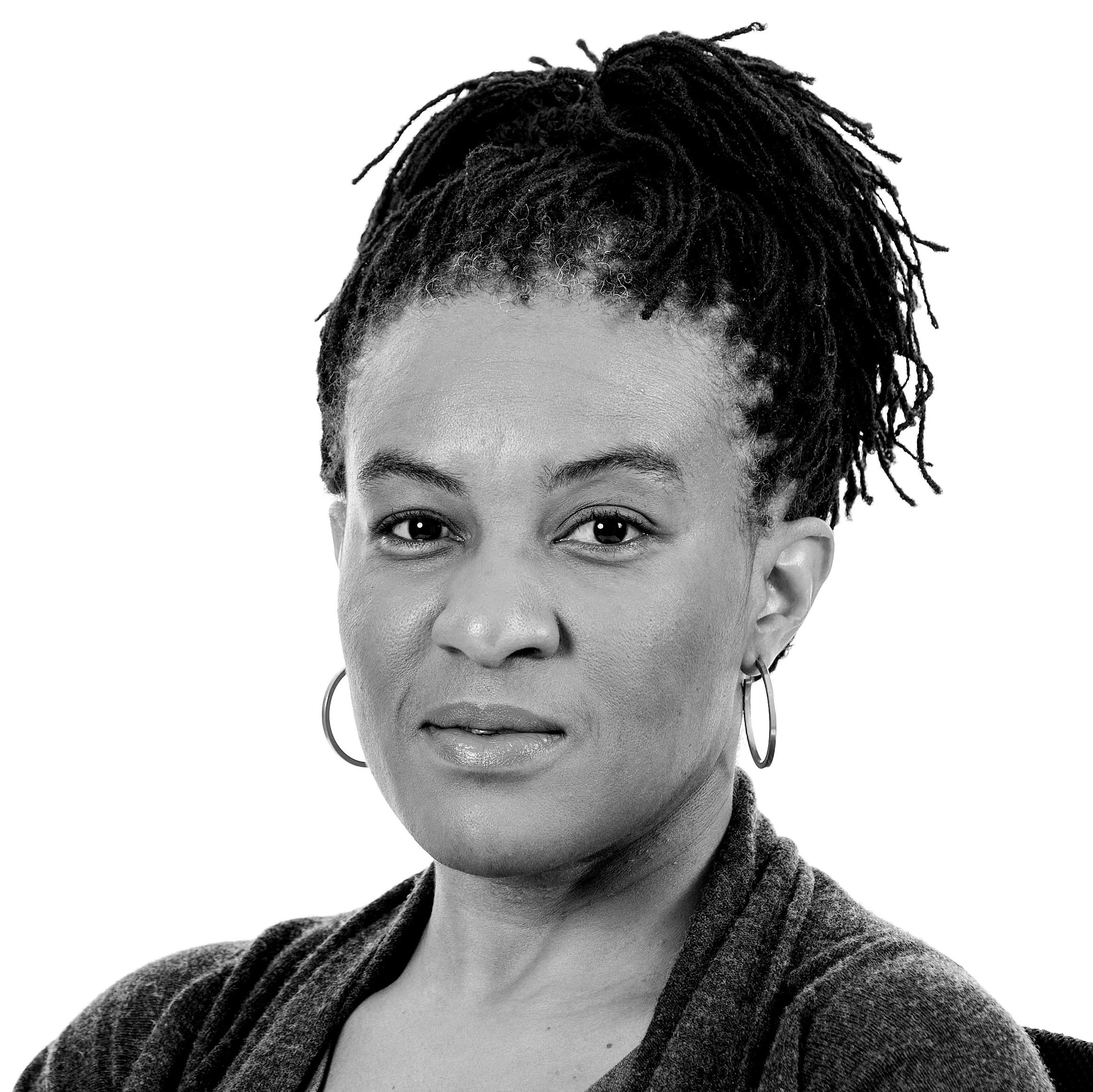
- Born: Cynthia Nwamaka Mbamali; Edinburgh, Scotland, UK
- Education: Intercalated Bachelor of Science Bachelor of Medicine and Bachelor of Surgery Doctor of Philosophy
- Occupation: Paediatric Radiologist
- Medical career
- Institutions: University of Sheffield & Sheffield Children's Hospital, Great Ormond Street Hospital London, Oldchurch Hospital Romford
- Sub-specialties: Paediatric musculoskeletal imaging
- Research: Physical child abuse and skeletal dysplasias

Amaka C. Offiah is a paediatric radiologist known for her expertise in musculoskeletal imaging, particularly in the areas of child abuse and skeletal dysplasias.

== Early life ==
Born in Edinburgh, the first of six children to Nigerian parents of Igbo origin, Professor Ernest Ikechukwu Mbamali (the third medical director of The National Orthopaedic Hospital, Kano) and chemical engineer, Dr Gladys Enuma Mbamali (née Agbakoba), Offiah's early education was at Gascoyne Cecil Junior School in Hatfield and then at the Convent of Saint Clotilde, Lechlade Manor.

== Education ==
Offiah moved to Nigeria at around age 12 attending St Louis Secondary School, Bompai, Kano. She gained an Intercalated BSc from the University of Ibadan, followed by her MBBS at Ahmadu Bello University, Zaria, in 1990. On her return to the United Kingdom, she worked at Oldchurch Hospital, Romford, where she obtained her Membership of the Royal College of Physicians of London . She then trained in Radiology in Sheffield from 1995 to 2000, gaining membership of the Royal College of Radiologists (RCR) and developing her interest in the radiological diagnosis of inflicted injury (child abuse), going on to specialise in paediatric radiology. She later completed a PhD at University College London/Institute of Child Health and joined The University of Sheffield (TUOS) and Sheffield Children's NHS Foundation Trust, where she integrated her clinical practice with her research interests.

== Career ==
Offiah is recognised as one of the few academic (University-employed) paediatric radiologists in the country and was the first female, first person of colour, and first paediatric radiologist to be awarded the Royal College of Radiology Roentgen Professorship. She has worked as an academic for TUOS since 2009, gaining her current role of Professor of Paediatric Musculoskeletal Imaging in 2020. Offiah has simultaneously held a role in the NHS as an Honorary Consultant Paediatric Radiologist since 2009.

Offiah's research focuses on her interest in the imaging of the paediatric musculoskeletal system in general and particularly in child abuse and skeletal dysplasias. Offiah has published over 400 works, including over 150 original and invited articles in peer-reviewed journals, three co-authored books, 15 book chapters and four international/national guidelines.

She has extensive experience as an expert witness to Her Majesty's courts in nearly 500 child abuse cases and been involved in the development of national guidelines for investigating suspected physical abuse in children. Her work has also been used to inform at least four other policy documents.

She served as a Member and then Chair of the European Society of Paediatric Radiology (ESPR) Publications Committee from 2015 to 2021. Continuing her work at ESPR, she Chairs the Child Abuse Task Force and is a member of the Musculoskeletal Task Force. She also chairs the Skeletal Dysplasia Group for Teaching and Research, is a member of the UNESCO Chair for Childhood Maltreatment and co-chairs her regional committee for Experts in the Family Justice System (EFJS).

In 2025, Offiah was elected as vice president (clinical radiology) of the Royal College of Radiologists, for a period of three years, one of only three people of colour to reach this level of seniority at the RCR. She is also the first female, and first person of colour, to serve as a managing editor for the journal Pediatric Radiology.

Beyond her clinical and research roles, Offiah is an advocate for equality, diversity, and inclusion. She is director of wellbeing, equality, diversity & inclusion at TUOS, chair of the university's Race Equality Delivery Group, the Sheffield lead for the Generation Delta project which seeks to lay a foundation to increase the number of black female professors in the United Kingdom, and a member of both the Medical Research Council's Black in Biomedical Research Advisory Group and the Equality, Diversity and Inclusion Committee of the Royal College of Radiologists.

== Research ==
Offiah has focused her research on imaging techniques for suspected child abuse and skeletal dysplasias, with an emphasis on distinguishing between children with fragile bones prone to fractures and children with healthy bones who may have been abused. Her work centres on optimising imaging methods, developing techniques to differentiate between brittle and normal bones, studying mechanisms of accidental injury in children, and establishing normative data for the paediatric musculoskeletal system, including through post-mortem imaging. Her work has helped both to design safer car seats and to develop techniques that will help clinicians more accurately determine whether an injury is accidental or the result of abuse.

== Awards and honours ==
- 2013 – RCR Roentgen Professor.
- 2015 – BIR/Bayer Make it Better Award, British Institute of Radiology.
- 2015 – BMJ Award Highly Commended Imaging Team, BMJ Publishing Group.
- 2022 – ESPR Jacques Lefebvre Lecture "Reverse radiology: diagnosis of skeletal dysplasias in the era of whole exome sequencing, artificial intelligence and drug trials".

== Bibliography ==
Selected books

- Fetal and Perinatal Skeletal Dysplasias: an Atlas of Multimodality Imaging 2nd Edition (2024) ISBN 978-0-367-76443-2
- Paediatric Radiology Rapid Reporting (2024) ISBN 978-3031482540

Selected articles

- Shalof, H., Chong, R.S., Rigby, A., Offiah, A.C. In children under two years of age, does the bone health index value differ between those with and without osteogenesis imperfecta? Bone 196, 116013 (2025). https://doi.org/10.1016/j.bone.2025.117467
- Klein, W.M., Offiah, A.C., Kvist, O., Rosendahl, K. On-call or not on-call, what difference does it make in paediatric radiology? Insights Imaging 16, 73 (2025). https://doi.org/10.1186/s13244-025-01948-0
- Paddock, M., Johnson, P.C., Staley, A., Halliday, K., Offiah, A.C. The impact of sedation on the quality of initial skeletal surveys performed for suspected physical abuse in children: a comparative two-centre audit. Clin Radiol 79, e1057–e1063 (2024). https://doi.org/10.1016/j.crad.2024.04.012
- Tong, L., Pooranawattanakul, S., Gopal-Kothandapani, J.S. et al. Comparison of prevalence and characteristics of fractures in term and preterm infants in the first 3 years of life. Pediatr Radiol 51, 86–93 (2021). https://doi.org/10.1007/s00247-020-04817-8
- Martin, A., Paddock, M., Johns, C.S. et al. Avoiding skull radiographs in infants with suspected inflicted injury who also undergo head CT: "a no-brainer?". Eur Radiol 30, 1480–1487 (2020). https://doi.org/10.1007/s00330-019-06579-w
- Alshamrani, K., & Offiah, A.C. Applicability of two commonly used bone age assessment methods to twenty-first century children. Eur Radiol 30, 504 (2020). https://doi.org/10.1016/j.crad.2019.08.029
- Alshamrani, K., Messina, F. & Offiah, A.C. Is the Greulich and Pyle atlas applicable to all ethnicities? A systematic review and meta-analysis. Eur Radiol 29, 2910–2923 (2019). https://doi.org/10.1007/s00330-018-5792-5
- Choudhary, A.K., Servaes, S., Slovis, T.L. et al. Consensus statement on abusive head trauma in infants and young children. Pediatr Radiol 48, 1048–1065 (2018). https://doi.org/10.1007/s00247-018-4149-1
