= Society for Pediatric Radiology =

The Society for Pediatric Radiology is a professional association of pediatric radiologists. The Society publishes the journal Pediatric Radiology and holds a yearly meeting. It was founded in 1958 at an informal meeting in Washington, DC, United States. Instrumental in its founding were John Caffey, Edward Neuhauser, and Frederic Silverman.

In 1985, Lionel W. Young became the first African American chair of the board of the Society for Pediatric Radiology.

== See also ==
- Radiology
- Radiological Society of North America
