= American Osteopathic Board of Radiology =

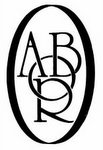
- Abbreviation: AOBR
- Formation: 1939
- Type: Professional
- Headquarters: Milan, MO
- Coordinates: 40.2028°N 93.12529°W
- Chairman: Jeffrey M. Wilseck, D.O.
- Vice Chairman: Roy M. Teng, D.O.
- Secretary-Treasurer: Michael A. Wilcyznski, D.O.
- Website: www.aobr.org

The American Osteopathic Board of Radiology (AOBR) is an organization that provides board certification to qualified Doctors of Osteopathic Medicine (D.O.) who specialize in the use of imaging in the diagnosis and treatment of disease (radiologists). The board is one 18 medical specialty certifying boards of the American Osteopathic Association Bureau of Osteopathic Specialists approved by the American Osteopathic Association (AOA), and was established in 1939. The American Osteopathic Board of Radiology and the American Board of Radiology are the two certifying boards for radiologists in the United States. As of December 2011, 732 osteopathic radiologists held active certification with the AOBR. Radiologists board certified by the AOBR are eligible for membership in the American College of Radiology.

== Board certification ==
Initial certification is available to osteopathic radiologists who have completed an AOA-approved residency in diagnostic radiology or radiation oncology, two years of practice, and passed oral and written exams.

Diplomates certified in diagnostic radiology or in radiation oncology before 2002 are eligible for voluntary recertification. Since 2002, the American Osteopathic Board of Radiology requires osteopathic radiologists to renew their certification every ten years to avoid expiration of their board certified status. Additionally, osteopathic radiologists who have completed the requirements set forth by the AOBR and completed an AOA-approved radiology residency may be eligible to pursue certification by the American Board of Radiology.

Osteopathic radiologists may also receive Certification of Added Qualifications (CAQ) in the following areas:

- Neuroradiology
- Pediatric Radiology
- Vascular & Interventional Radiology

== See also ==
- American Board of Radiology
- American Osteopathic Association Bureau of Osteopathic Specialists
- American Osteopathic College of Radiology
