= American Board of Science in Nuclear Medicine =

The American Board of Science in Nuclear Medicine, founded in 1976, also known as the ABSNM, is an organization in North America that offers certification to specialty areas of advanced nuclear medicine.

The board offers certification in the following areas:

- Nuclear Medicine Physics and Instrumentation
- Radiopharmaceutical Science
- Radiation Protection
- Molecular Imaging

The ABSNM is co-sponsored by the Society of Nuclear Medicine and Molecular Imaging, the American College of Nuclear Physicians, and the American College of Nuclear Medicine and offers an equivalent board to that of the ABR for physicists to be certified in nuclear medicine

The board is officially recognized by the American Association of Physicists in Medicine, American College of Radiology and the Nuclear Regulatory Commission under 10 CFR Part 35.50(a)(2).

== See also ==
- American Board of Radiology
