= Deborah E. Citrin =

American clinician and scientist

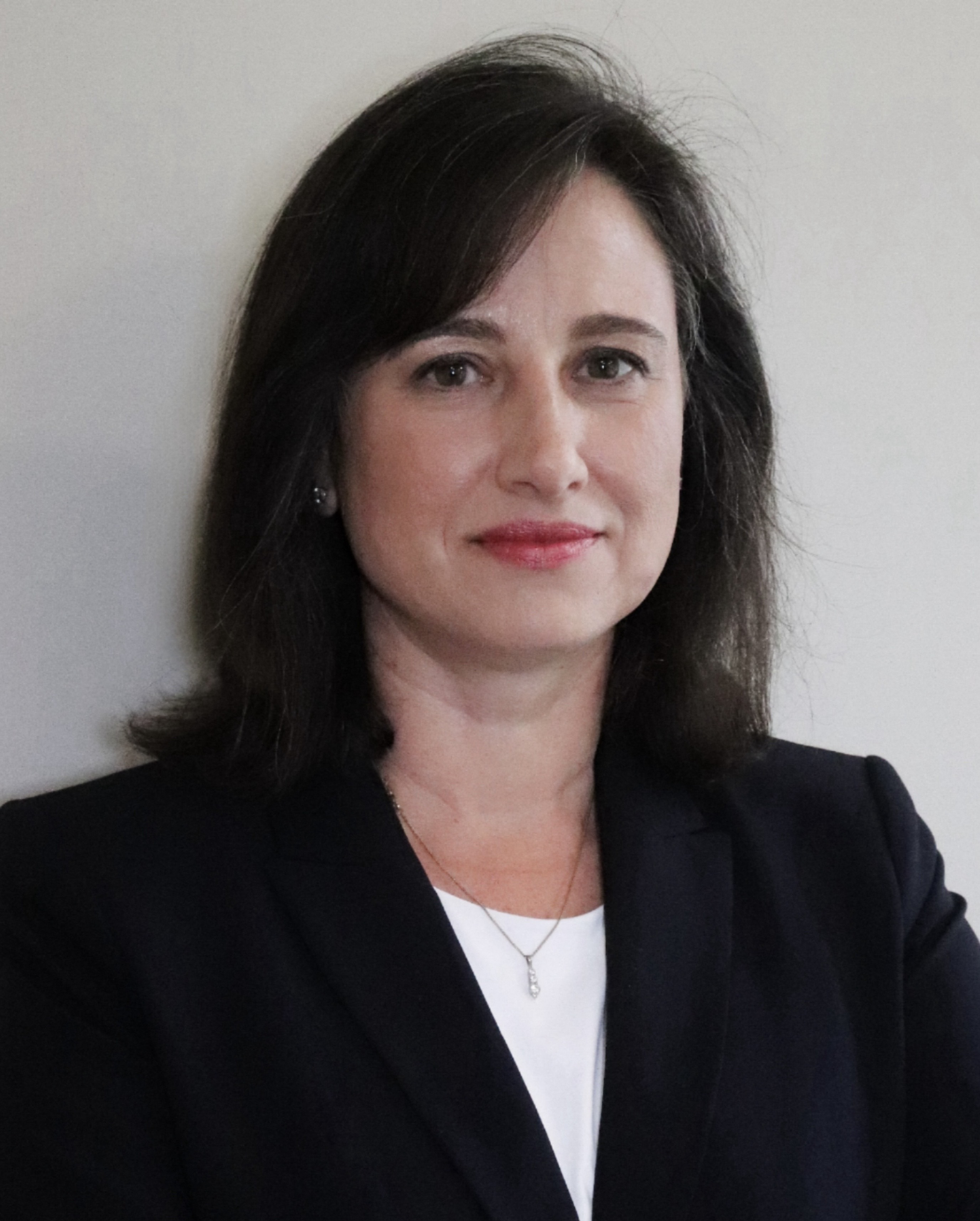
- Education: North Carolina State University (BS); Duke University School of Medicine (MD)
- Children: 3
- Scientific career
- Fields: Cancer research
- Workplaces: National Cancer Institute

Deborah E. Citrin is an American clinician-scientist researching pre-clinical and clinical testing of radiation modifiers and the mechanisms of normal tissue injury from radiation. She is a senior investigator and deputy director of the National Cancer Institute's Center for Cancer Research.

== Life ==
Citrin completed a B.S. in biology at North Carolina State University. She earned a M.D. at Duke University School of Medicine. In 2001, Citrin came to the National Cancer Institute (NCI) and the National Capital Consortium to compete residency training.

At NCI, Citrin became a staff clinician (2005–2007), an associate clinical investigator (2006–2007), and an investigator (2007). She is a clinician and translational researcher in the radiation oncology branch at NCI. Citrin is a senior investigator and deputy director of the NCI Center for Cancer Research. Her research interests include the pre-clinical and clinical testing of radiation modifiers and the mechanisms of normal tissue injury from radiation. Citrin is involved in the clinical care of patients with genitourinary cancers (prostate and bladder) and gastrointestinal cancers. Citrin develops strategies to enhance the capacity of radiation to kill tumor cells while protecting normal tissue from the side effects of radiation treatment. Her laboratory work focuses on aging in tissue exposed to radiation through stem cell senescence. She is board certified by the American Board of Radiology.

Citrin has 3 children.
