= Global radiology =

Study of radiology resources in developing countries

Global radiology, a subspecialty of diagnostic radiology, comprises the study and practice of improving access to radiology resources in poor and developing countries, and addressing global health inequities through the application of radiology. Similar to the fields of public health and global health, global radiology draws on and encourages collaboration with nonmedical specialties relevant to disease patterns and the provision of medical services, including economic development, biomedical technology, engineering and social sciences.

According to the World Health Organization, one half to two-thirds of the global population lacks access to radiological services due primarily to shortages in diagnostic equipment and trained personnel. The practice of global outreach radiology, as well as education and training programs related to global radiology, have been spearheaded by organizations including the American College of Radiology, the Radiological Society of North America, the American Roentgen Ray Society, the Royal College of Radiologists, the International Union of Interventional Radiologists, Imaging the World and the World Federation of Pediatric Imaging. Growing interest in global health among radiology resident physicians has spurred some radiology residency programs to offer global health training. In 2014, the American College of Radiology proposed a formal “global health imaging curriculum” for residents.

The academic component of global radiology involves the study of obstacles to obtaining access to imaging services and technology, and research on efforts to improve global health through radiology. This work encompasses both original research using data collected through radiology outreach projects in specific locales, and broader epidemiological assessments informed by imaging data. Conferences, such as the world congresses hosted by the International Society of Radiographers and Radiological Technologists, offer academics and non-academics involved in global radiology an opportunity to “discuss data, experiences, and models pertaining to radiology in the developing world and to evaluate potential opportunities for future collaboration.” While much of the research published has appeared in various radiology journals, in 2014 the Journal of Global Radiology, founded by Dr. Sarwat Hussain of University of Massachusetts Medical School, became the first journal dedicated to global radiology.
