= Joseph Volpe =

Joseph Volpe may refer to:

- Joe Volpe (born 1947), Canadian politician
- Joseph Volpe (opera manager) (born 1940), American opera manager and arts management consultant
- Joseph Volpe (physician) (born 1938), American physician and neurologist
