= Infantile cortical hyperostosis =

Inflammatory disorder in infants

- Other names: Caffey disease
- Specialty: Rheumatology

Infantile cortical hyperostosis (ICH) is a self-limited inflammatory disorder of infants that causes bone changes, soft tissue swelling and irritability. The disease may be present at birth or occur shortly thereafter. The cause is unknown. Both familial and sporadic forms occur. It is also known as Caffey disease or Caffey's disease.

== Presentation ==
An affected infant typically has the following triad of signs and symptoms: soft-tissue swelling, bone lesions, and irritability. The swelling occurs suddenly, is deep, firm, and may be tender. Lesions are often asymmetric and may affect several parts of the body. Affected bones have included the mandible, tibia, ulna, clavicle, scapula, ribs, humerus, femur, fibula, skull, ilium, and metatarsals. When the mandible (lower jaw bone) is affected, infants may refuse to eat, leading to failure to thrive.

== Genetics ==
ICH is associated with autosomal dominant pathogenic variants in COL1A1 and possibly IFITM5.

== Pathophysiology ==
In the early stages of infantile cortical hyperostosis, biopsy shows inflammation of the periosteum and adjacent soft tissues. After this resolves, the periosteum remains thickened, and subperiosteal immature lamellar bone can be seen on biopsy, while the bone marrow spaces contain vascular fibrous tissue. Eventually, the inflammation and subperiosteal changes resolve, and hyperplasia of lamellar cortical bone can be seen.

Radiographs initially show layers of periosteal new bone formation with cortical thickening. Periosteal new bone may cover the diaphysis of the bone, causing an increase in diameter of the bone. Over time, the periosteal new bone density increases, becoming homogeneous with the underlying cortex. Eventually, the bone remodels and resumes a normal appearance.

== Diagnosis ==
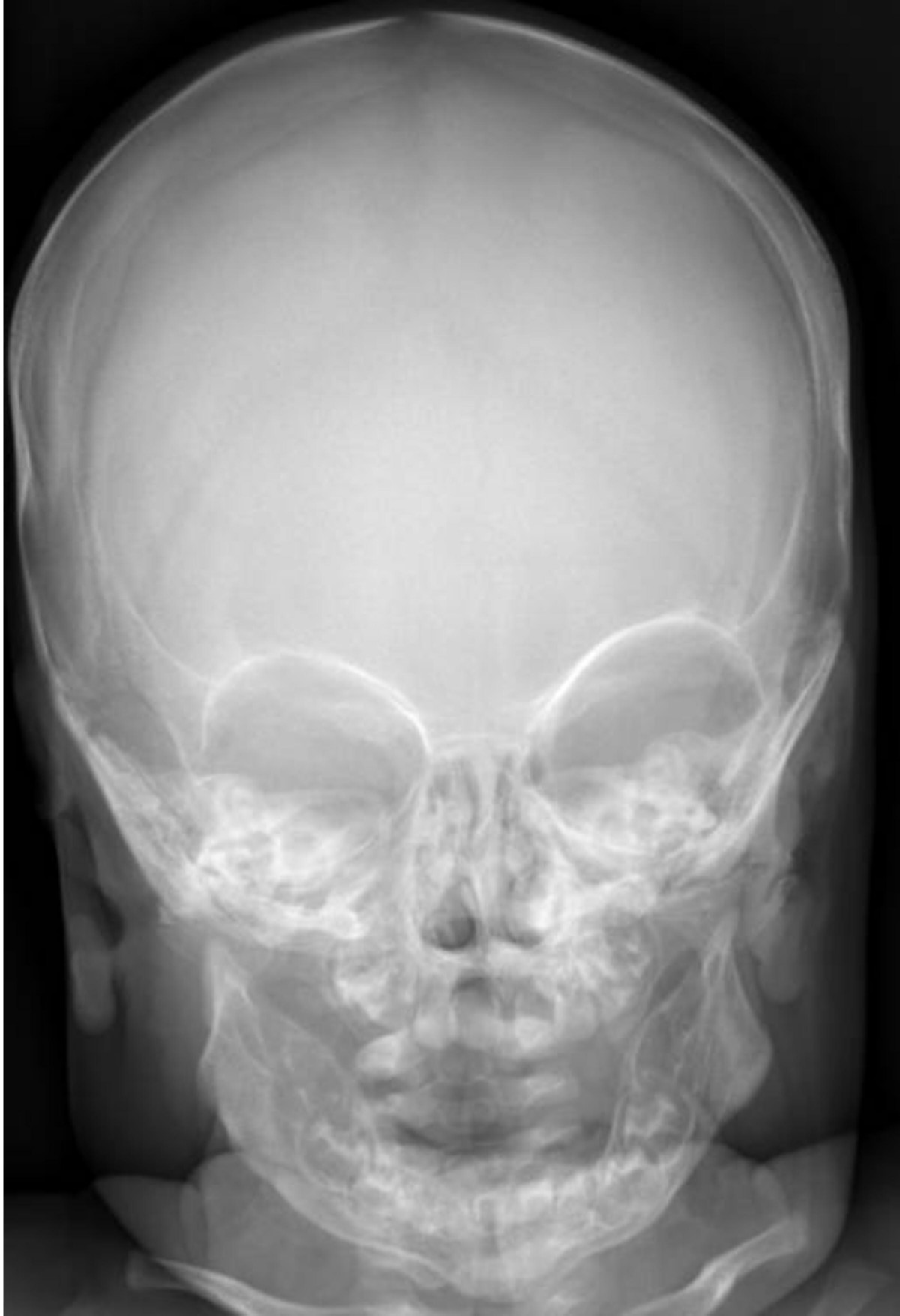
Anteroposterior radiograph of the skull showed massive sclerosis of the skull bone associated with significant cortical hyperostosis and enlargement of the mandible secondary to cortical new bone formation.

Most infants with infantile cortical hyperostosis are diagnosed by physical examination. X-rays can confirm the presence of bone changes and soft tissue swelling. Biopsy of the affected areas can confirm the presence of typical histopathological changes. No specific blood tests exist, but tests such as erythrocyte sedimentation rate (ESR) and alkaline phosphatase levels are often elevated. A complete blood count may show anemia (low red blood cell count) and leukocytosis (high white blood cell count). Other tests may be done to help exclude other diagnoses. Ultrasound imaging can help diagnose prenatal cases.

=== Differential diagnosis ===
Osteomyelitis (bone infection), which is much more common than infantile cortical hyperostosis, must be excluded, since it requires urgent treatment. Other diagnoses that can mimic this disorder and need to be excluded include physical trauma, child abuse, Vitamin A excess, hyperphosphatemia, prostaglandin E1 and E2 administration, scurvy, infections (including syphilis), Ewing sarcoma, and metastatic neuroblastoma.

== Prognosis ==
Infantile cortical hyperostosis is a self-limited condition, meaning that the disease resolves on its own without treatment, usually within 6–9 months. Long-term deformities of the involved bones, including bony fusions and limb-length inequalities, are possible but rare.

== Epidemiology ==
The disease has been reported to affect 3 per 1000 infants younger than 6 months in the United States. No predilection by race or sex has been established. Almost all cases occur by the age of 5 months. The familial form is inherited in an autosomal dominant fashion with variable penetrance. The familial form tends to have an earlier onset and is present at birth in 24% of cases, with an average age at onset of 6.8 weeks. The average age at onset for the sporadic form is 9–11 weeks.
Cortical hyperostosis is a potential side effect of long-term use of prostaglandins in neonates.

== History ==
Dr. John Caffey (1895–1978) first described infantile cortical hyperostosis in 1945. He described a group of infants with tender swelling in the soft tissues and cortical thickenings in the skeleton, with onset of these findings during the first 3 months of life. Dr. Caffey was regarded throughout the world as the father of pediatric radiology. His classic textbook, Pediatric X-Ray Diagnosis, which was first published in 1945, has become the recognized bible and authority in its field.
