= EOS imaging =

Med tech company based in Paris

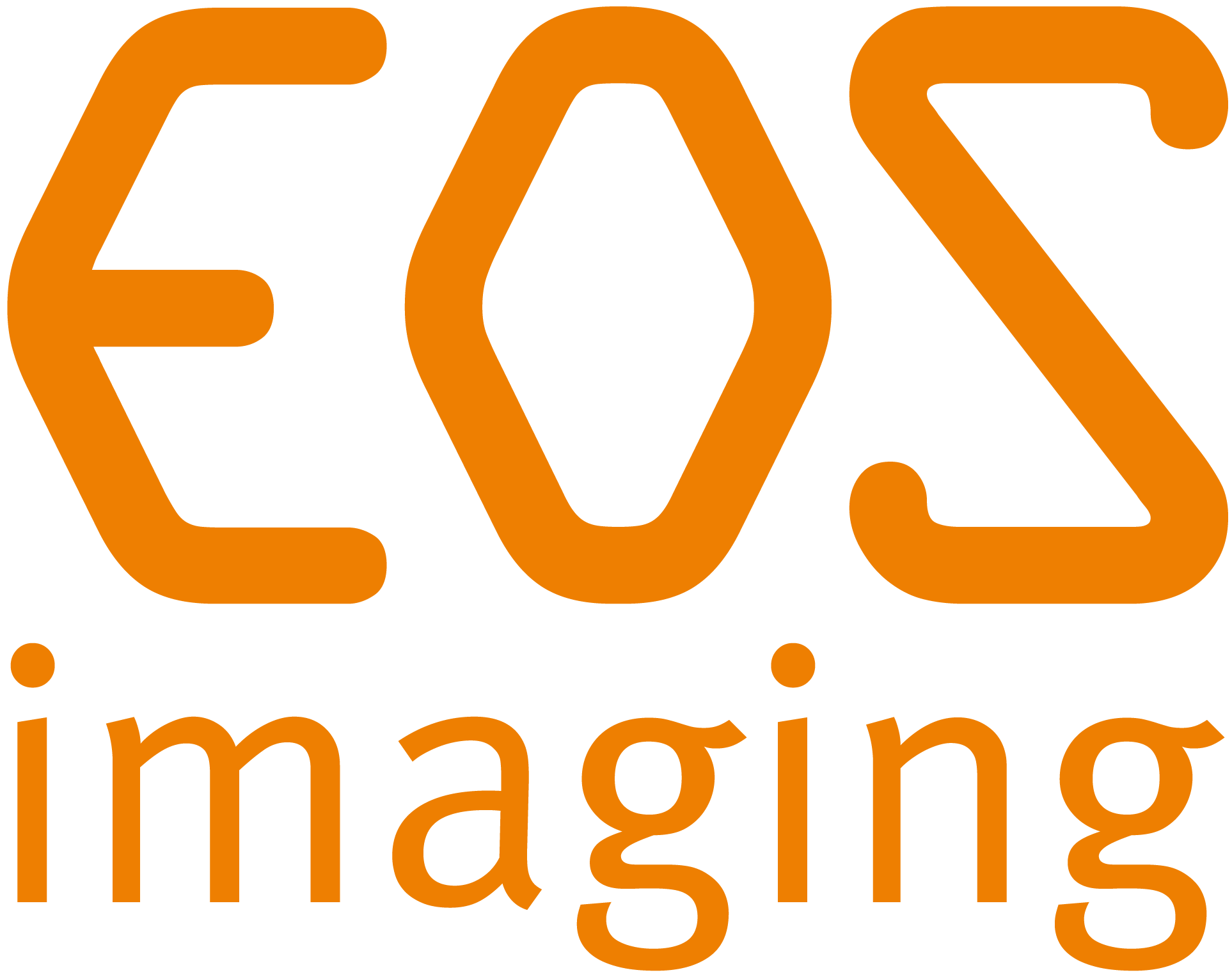
- Company type: Medical device company
- Traded as: Euronext: EOSI
- Industry: Medical devices, medical imaging
- Founded: 1989
- Founder: Georges Charpak
- Headquarters: 10 rue Mercoeur Paris, FRANCE
- Area served: Worldwide
- Key people: Lukas Vancura
- Products: EOS system, EOSedge, sterEOS workstation, EOSapps
- Revenue: €35.3 million
- Website: www.eos-imaging.com

EOS imaging is a medical device company based in Paris, France, that designs, develops, and markets EOSedge and the EOS system, innovative, orthopedic medical imaging systems, associated with several orthopedic solutions along the patient care pathway – from diagnosis to post-operative treatments. The EOS platform targets musculoskeletal disorders and orthopedic surgical care through 2D X-ray scans and 3D skeletal models from stereo-radiographic images of patients in a seated or standing position.

The philosophy of EOS imaging surrounds three main principles: reduction of the radiation dose emitted by the technology, relevance and manipulability of calculated clinical parameters, and optimization of the patient care workflow. Currently, over 300 EOS systems are installed in medical centers in 51 different countries, including the United States, Japan, Korea, China, and throughout the European Union.

== History ==
Biospace Med logo

The EOS imaging technology stems from the scientific findings of Georges Charpak (Nobel Prize in Physics, 1992) concerning radiation detection and particle physics, especially the multi-wire chamber. Since then, physicists, engineers, radiologists, and surgeons have collaborated to transform these findings into a new technology called the EOS system.

EOS imaging began in 1989 as Biospace Med, a medical company founded by Georges Charpak for the development of his detection technology. In 1999, Marie Meynadier became the CEO of Biospace Med; she developed the company's first subsidiary dedicated to imaging solutions for pre-clinical research – the EOS system.

In 2004, hospitals in Paris, France and Brussels, Belgium finished running clinical tests on the EOS prototype, and in 2005, the first fundraising efforts commenced with the company's first venture capital round.

From 2007 to 2011, the company obtained CE marking in Europe and FDA approval to market the EOS system and the sterEOS 2D/3D workstation in the United States.

The first installations of EOS in European and North American hospitals and clinics occurred from 2008 to 2010. In 2011, the EOS system was being integrated into clinical routines of medical centers in 10 countries, including the United States, Canada, and Australia.

In 2010, Biospace Med changed its name to EOS imaging.

In 2012, EOS imaging entered the Euronext Paris stock exchange (name: EOSI) and had its first installation in Asia.

In 2013, EOS acquired the medical company oneFIT Medical (see Acquisition of oneFIT Medical). In 2014, EOS provided the EOS system in the Vietnam market (Medic - Medic Hoa Hao) through Bluelight.

In 2015, the CFDA certification in China and the NECA designation in Korea were obtained, allowing the company to further expand its market.

In 2016, the company entered into the Latin American market with the signing of its first contract in Brazil.

In 2019, the company launched EOSedge, its new generation imaging system powered by photon-counting technology.

== Corporate locations ==
While based in Paris, France, EOS imaging has five other corporate locations in various regions around the world: Besançon, France; St. Paul, Minnesota, US; Montreal, Quebec, Canada; Frankfurt, Germany, and in Singapore.

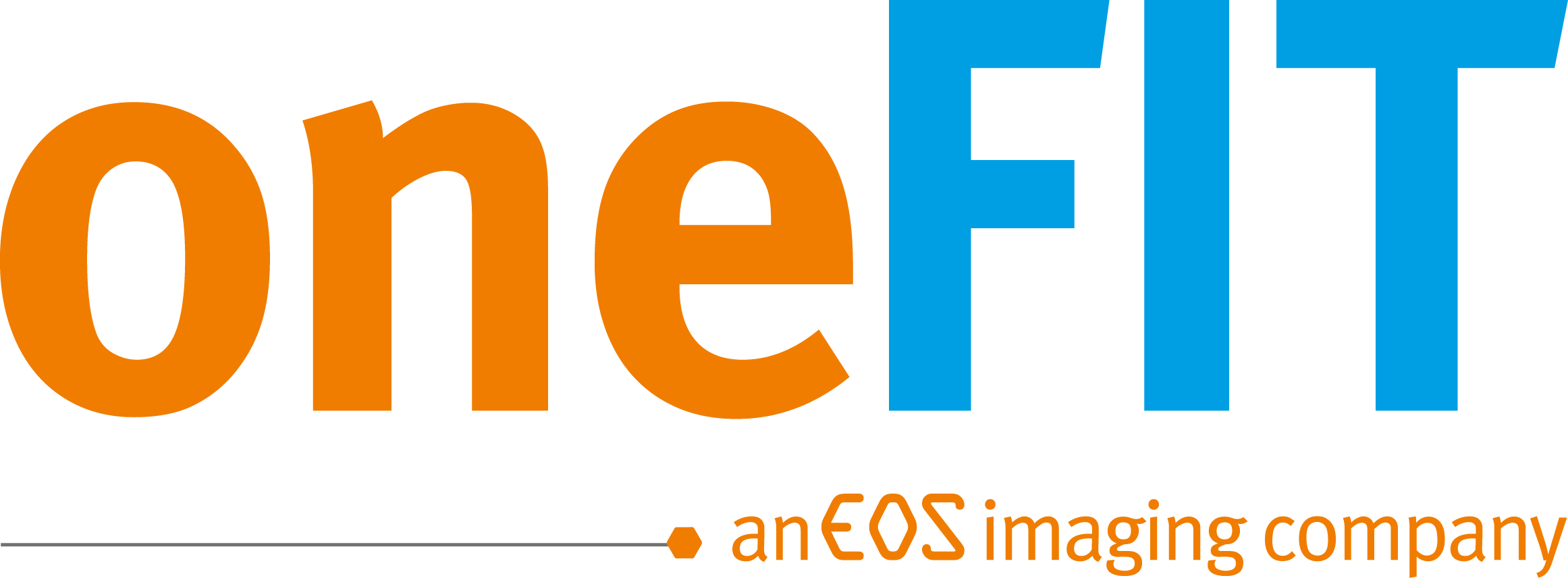
oneFIT Medical logo

=== Acquisition of oneFIT Medical ===
In 2013, EOS imaging acquired oneFIT Medical (based in Besançon, France), a medical software engineering and manufacturing company dedicated to the development of surgical planning software for spine, hip, and knee surgeries and patient-specific orthopedic surgical cutting guides.

== Products ==
=== The EOS Systems ===
EOS imaging platforms—EOSedge and EOS—deliver unique and specific capabilities that are used in conjunction with EOS Advanced Orthopedic Solutions to generate highly accurate 3D representations of patient anatomy and enable a seamless surgical planning experience.

The EOS examination takes place in an upright scanning cabin where the patient can either stand or sit. With a vertically traveling arm supporting two fine X-ray beams perpendicular to one another, the EOS system acquires frontal and lateral, weight-bearing images of the patient in a functional – standing or sitting – position. These biplanar images are then used to create a 3D model of the patient's skeleton.

==== ALARA and the Micro Dose Feature ====
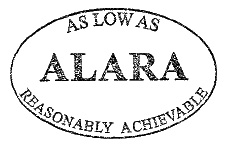
ALARA logo

The ALARA principle (As Low As Reasonably Achievable) represents a movement to “minimize radiation doses and releases of radioactive materials” by minimizing the time of exposure to radiation, increasing the distance between the human body and the radiation source, and using absorber materials to shield the body from beta particles, X-rays, and gamma rays.

EOS imaging aligns itself with this principle, providing reduced exam times and amounts of radiation in comparison with conventional imaging systems. Furthermore, EOS developed a Micro Dose option that further reduced the radiation exposure by 5.5 times compared to a typical low-dose EOS exam protocol, resulting in a nearly negligible radiation dose. Additionally, with Flex Dose technology, EOSedge can deliver up to an 80% overall radiation reduction compared to same acquisition without Flex Dose.

Having reduced-radiation options available for patients has become critical in the world of medical imaging as radiation exposure from artificial sources, such as medical imaging, has increased over the last two decades, and many patients require multiple examinations throughout the course of their medical treatment.

=== sterEOS Workstation ===
The sterEOS workstation enables the generation of patient-specific 3D models of the spine and/or lower limbs from weight-bearing low dose or Micro Dose EOS exams. Once the models are created, clinical parameters are automatically calculated and may be exported as a patient report including 2D images and 3D captures. This report is used by physicians for diagnosis, post-operative assessment, and patient follow-up. sterEOS also enables the exportation of 3D anatomical biomarkers for pre-operative planning.

=== EOSapps: EOS' associated software ===
The EOSapps (kneeEOS, hipEOS, and spineEOS) are online, 3D surgical planning solutions based on the weight-bearing EOS images. Frontal and lateral EOS images are uploaded to the EOS Portal, where the EOS 3DServices team prepares the 3D models and dataset and makes the planning case available online. Surgeons can have access to the patient's anatomy information in 3D, with which they can plan and simulate the effect of different implant selections and positions in 3D. spineEOS is used to plan spine surgeries, hipEOS is used for the planning of total hip arthroplasty, and kneeEOS is geared towards the planning of total knee arthroplasty.

== See also ==
- EOS (medical imaging)
