= Pediatric Radiology (journal) =

- Discipline: Radiology
- Language: English
- Edited by: Professor Geetika Khanna, Professor Amaka Offiah

Publication details
- History: 1973-present
- Publisher: Springer Nature
- Frequency: Monthly
- Impact factor: 3.005 (2021)

Standard abbreviations
- ISO 4: Pediatr. Radiol.

Indexing
- CODEN: PDRYA5
- ISSN: 0301-0449 (print); 1432-1998 (web)
- OCLC no.: 01696630

Links
- Journal homepage

Pediatric Radiology is a peer-reviewed medical journal covering all areas of pediatric imaging and related fields published by Springer Nature. It is the official journal of the European Society of Paediatric Radiology, Society for Pediatric Radiology, Asian and Oceanic Society for Pediatric Radiology, and the Latin American Society of Pediatric Radiology. The editors in chief are Professor Amaka Offiah (Sheffield, UK) and Professor Geetika Khanna (Atlanta, Georgia).

== Abstracting and indexing ==
The journal is abstracted and indexed in Academic OneFile, Cengage, Proquest, Current Contents/Clinical Medicine, EBSCO databases, Embase, INIS Atomindex, PubMed/MEDLINE, Science Citation Index, Scopus, and Summon by Serial Solutions. According to the Journal Citation Reports, the journal has a 2021 impact factor of 3.005 .
