= Edward B. D. Neuhauser =

American physician

- Born: 1908
- Died: 1987 (aged 78–79)
- Education: University of Pennsylvania
- Scientific career
- Fields: Pediatrics

Edward B. D. Neuhauser (1908–1987) was an American physician who was known for his work in pediatric radiology, helping to establish it as a scientific discipline.

Neuhauser was born in Philadelphia and received his medical degree from the University of Pennsylvania. He was the first president of the Society for Pediatric Radiology, which he helped found in 1958. In 1964 he became one of the founder members of the European Society for Pediatric Radiology.
