= Joseph Volpe (physician) =

American neurologist and academic

- Born: December 17, 1938 (age 86)
- Occupation: Child neurologist
- Employer(s): Washington University in St. Louis; Harvard University; Boston Children's Hospital
- Notable work: Neurology of the Newborn

Joseph J. Volpe (born December 17, 1938) is an American physician, the Bronson Crothers Professor of Neurology, Emeritus at Harvard Medical School and Neurologist-in-Chief Emeritus at Boston Children's Hospital. He was an early contributor to the field of neonatal neurology and has authored several editions of an influential textbook, Neurology of the Newborn.

== Biography ==
Volpe earned a medical degree from Harvard Medical School before completing training at Massachusetts General Hospital and the National Institutes of Health. His early career was spent as the Stein Professor of Neurology and Director of the Division of Pediatric Neurology at Washington University School of Medicine. He came to Boston Children's Hospital in 1990.

In the 1980s, Volpe devised a classification system for a newborn brain condition known as hypoxic-ischemic encephalopathy. He also proposed one of two grading scales for a type of newborn brain bleeding known as intraventricular hemorrhage. Volpe's later research has involved periventricular leukomalacia, a type of white matter brain injury that is closely associated with cerebral palsy risk.

At least two of Volpe's studies with newborn babies received significant attention in the mass media. In 1983, he found that the rate of intraventricular hemorrhage among small premature infants was much higher than previously thought. In 1992, he wrote a review detailing the neurological effects of fetal cocaine exposure.

Volpe is the author of Neurology of the Newborn; several editions have been published. After the third edition was published in 1995, Laura Ment wrote in the New England Journal of Medicine that the book's 1981 emergence "lent formal recognition to the emerging concept that the neurologic problems of the developing brain were uniquely different from those of the brains of adults and older children."

In 1997, Volpe was elected to the Institute of Medicine. He was selected by the American Academy of Pediatrics to deliver the 2012 William A. Silverman Lecture.
