= EOS (medical imaging) =

- Purpose: provide frontal and lateral radiography images

EOS is a medical imaging system designed to provide frontal and lateral radiography images, while limiting the X-ray dose absorbed by the patient in a sitting or standing position. The system relies on the high sensitivity of a detector (multi-wire chamber) invented by Georges Charpak, which earned him the 1992 Nobel Prize. This technology not only enhances patient safety but also improves diagnostic accuracy, making EOS particularly valuable in monitoring musculoskeletal conditions and guiding orthopedic treatments.

EOS is commercialized by the French company EOS imaging as an orthopedic application whose main feature is the 3D visualization of the vertebral column and/or lower limbs of the patients. The device develops statistical models by collecting anteroposterior and lateral 2D images of an individuals entire body.

EOS focuses on using an approach that centers around precision medicine, or a medical approach that considers a patient's genetics, environmental factors, and health habits in order to create a more personalized treatment or diagnosis for disease.

== Process ==
=== Medical Imaging Within Cardiovascular Medicine ===
These images can be used to image the electrical activity within the cells of hearts. Richard Barr, a Duke University biomedical engineer, created a computer program that creates a simulation environment to model the electrical activity within cardiac cells. This allows for medical professionals to gain a deeper understanding of the heart's functionality without an incision needing to be made, because activity among these cells is non-linear and unpredictable. By visualizing the behavior of cardiac cells, this program helps improve our understanding of the human heart, which will improve our ability to develop personalized treatment for heart disease.

Another technique, coined by Elizabeth Bucholz, focuses on a four-dimensional imaging technique using pre-existing MRI technology for mice. This technique involves injecting the liposomal agent into the bloodstream, and then the tool captures images of the heart over time. Once the images are collected, a 4D model of the heart is created, allowing the researchers to analyze the heart's performance and other important health factors.

== Benefits ==
EOS offers many more advantages over any other medical imaging techniques. For example, the ability to create 3D reconstructions from its data, a lower dose of radiation, and whole body imaging.

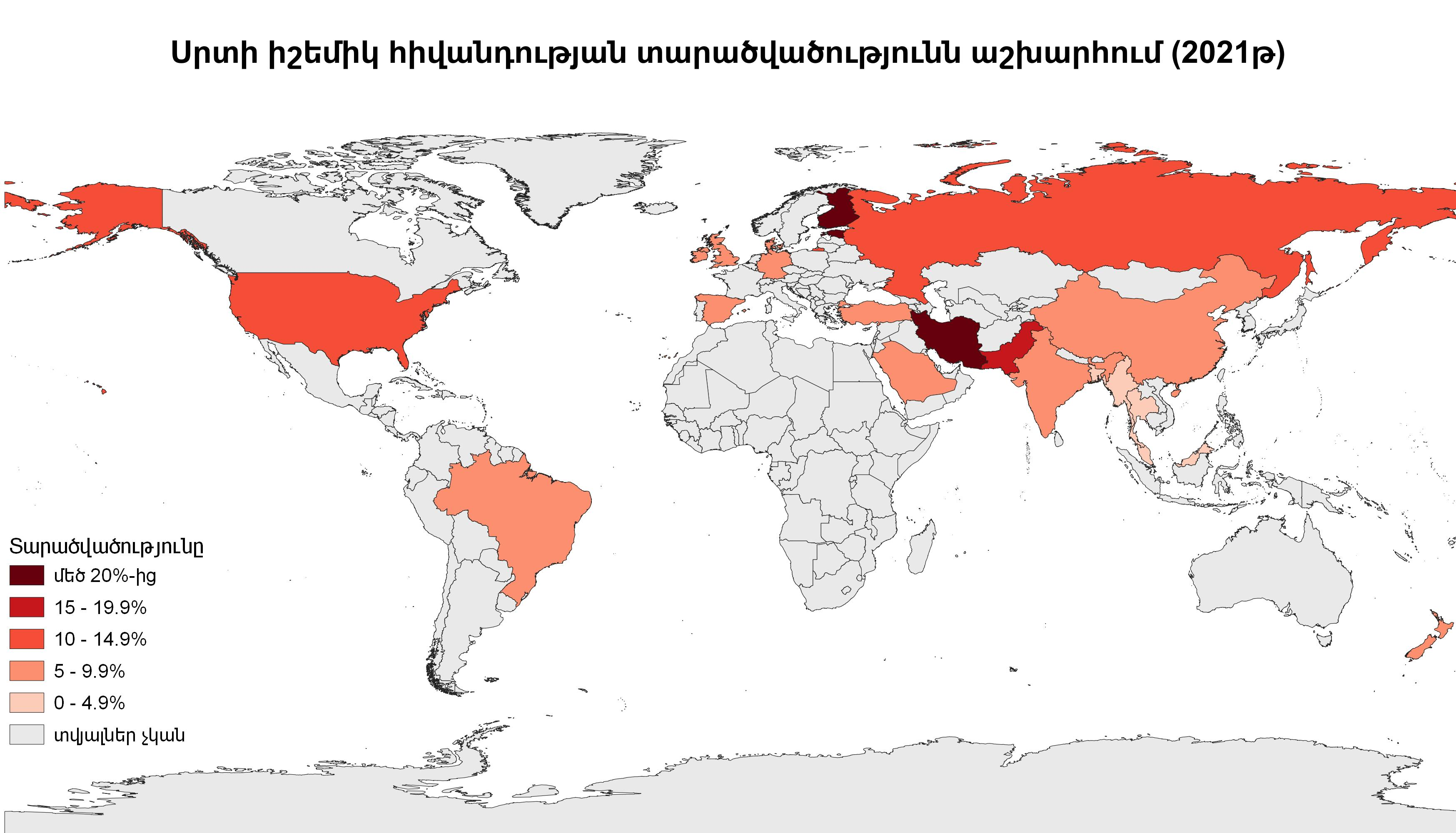
Heart disease across the world
