= American College of Radiology =

Professional medical society representing radiologists, oncologists, and others

- Chair: Christoph Wald
- President: Alan H. Matsumoto
- Website: acr.org

The American College of Radiology (ACR), founded in 1923, is a professional medical society representing nearly 40,000 diagnostic radiologists, radiation oncologists, interventional radiologists, nuclear medicine physicians and medical physicists.

The ACR has 54 chapters in the United States, Canada and the Council of Affiliated Regional Radiation Oncology Societies (CARROS).

== Medical imaging accreditation ==
The ACR has accredited more than 39,000 medical imaging facilities in 10 imaging modalities since 1987, including:

- Breast MRI
- Breast Ultrasound
- Computed Tomography
- Mammography
- Magnetic Resonance Imaging
- Nuclear Medicine
- Positron Emission Tomography
- Radiation Oncology Practice
- Stereotactic Breast Biopsy
- Ultrasound

== Specialized medical education ==
- ACR Education Center – located in Reston, VA, offers specialized mini-fellowships in more than a dozen clinical areas.
- American Institute for Radiologic Pathology (AIRP) – The AIRP conducts five courses for radiology residents and fellows, and seven categorical courses for practicing radiologists and other physicians each year in Silver Spring, MD.
- Radiology Leadership Institute (RLI) – The RLI offers leadership and business management training specifically for radiologists.

== Publications ==
- The Journal of the American College of Radiology (JACR) – The official journal of ACR.
- ACR Bulletin – a monthly publication covering topics on radiology.

== Collaborations ==
The ACR provides patient information through the website Radiologyinfo.org, co-produced by the Radiological Society of North America, to help patients understand how various radiology procedures and radiation therapy are performed.

== Imaging 3.0 ==
ACR's Imaging 3.0 initiative is a roadmap to transition the practice of radiology from volume-based to value-based care. Four main focus areas of Imaging 3.0 include;

- Integrated service environment – Integrating radiologists in the patient care continuum i.
- New healthcare organizations – Participate in the design, maintenance, and management of these new health care organizations, such as PCMHs, ACOs, and those yet to be formed.
- Patient-focused care – Ensure patients understand their options regarding medical imaging, offer radiology reports in terms, and provide basic education on imaging exams and preparation for them.
- A network of tools and services – Expert advice from leading radiology, technology, and business consultants.

== See also ==
- American Board of Radiology
