= Paediatric radiology =

Medical imaging of fetuses

Paediatric radiology (or pediatric radiology) is a subspecialty of radiology involving the imaging of fetuses, infants, children, adolescents and young adults. Many paediatric radiologists practise at children's hospitals.

Although some diseases seen in paediatrics are the same as that in adults, there are many conditions which are seen only in infants. The specialty has to take in account the dynamics of a growing body, from preterm infants to large adolescents, where the organs follow growth patterns and phases. These require specialised imaging and treatment which is carried out in a children's hospital, since it has all the necessary facilities to treat children and their specific pathologies.

== Environment ==
An environment where a child feels comfortable, is required to acquire high-quality images in order to successfully diagnose a paediatric condition. This is one of the most essential elements to paediatric radiology. For imaging departments which specialise in paediatric radiology, rooms can be tailored to suit a child's needs. For example, bright wall designs, visual stimulation and toys. These can be permanent installations as the department wouldn't need to cater to any other age range. For departments which only see children occasionally, creating a child-friendly environment is more difficult. It is usually achieved by creating one room as a child-friendly room where murals / stencils can be painted on the wall. Modern children's hospitals, such as Evelina Children's Hospital, are designed with a great amount of glass to allow as much natural light in as possible.

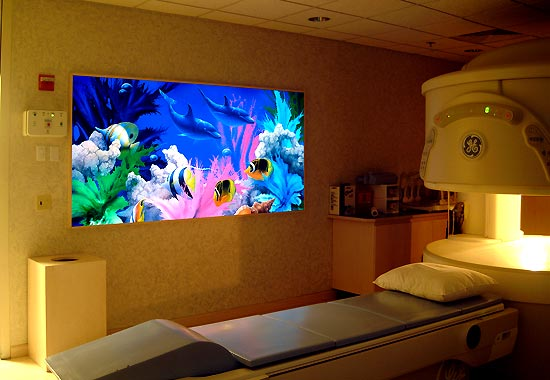
A child-friendly MRI scanner

== Challenges ==
Paediatric radiology comes with many challenges. Unlike adults, children cannot always understand / comprehend a change of environment. Therefore, staff are usually required to wear colourful uniforms, usually scrubs, as opposed to a normal hospital uniform. It is also important to recognise that when a child is unwell, they follow their instincts, which is usually to cry and stay close to their parents. This presents a huge obstacle for the radiographer, who must try to gain the child's trust and gain their co-operation. Once co-operation has been achieved there is another big challenge of keeping the child still for their imaging test. This can be very difficult for children in a lot of pain. Coercion and support from parents is usually enough to achieve this, however, in some extreme cases (such as MRI and CT), it may be necessary to sedate the child.

Another challenge faced is the radiation difference between an adult and child.

Medical Use of Radiation: Medicine has used ionising radiation for decades to help diagnose or treat children (and adults). There is no doubt that this imaging has saved lives. Medical imaging use has grown exponentially in the past few years, particularly the use of CAT Scans (also called CT scans). There are approximately 65 million CT scans done in the United States annually with an estimated 8 million in children. However, there is a much higher radiation dose from CT scans than from the traditional radiographs and fluoroscopy tests that radiologists perform and interpret. CT scans provide in general more information about the anatomy and diseases in the body but could be replaced for some orthopaedic indications by other low-dose imaging modalities like EOS. To do this, though, they may expose a person to 100 to 250 times the radiation dose compared to a chest x-ray.

Radiation Safety Issues: There are risks from ionising radiation that are comprehensively studied in the survivors of the atomic bomb in Hiroshima in 1945. Longitudinal studies led by the National Academy of Sciences in the United States have shown increased cancer rates in this population that are dose dependent. From these data, modelling research suggests that even at the lower doses used in medical imaging, there may be an added risk of cancer. Last year, two medical physicists suggested that the increasing use of CAT Scans in the United States may increase cancer incidence in the future.

Paediatric Radiation Protection Issues: Children are more radiosensitive than adults. They also have a longer life expectancy over which they may develop cancer from exposures to ionising radiation. The paediatric radiology and medical community has long had an awareness of this issue and has developed radiation protection policies and practices that reflect this. With the increased use of imaging and in particular, CT scanning, there is increasing attention to this issue by the entire medical and radiology communities. An educational resource for health care providers as well as patients and parents is the Image Gently web site started in 2008.There is collaboration by several radiology, medical physics, paediatrics, and governmental organisations to increase awareness of radiation safety issues in children and to provide education to all stakeholders caring for children on ways to decrease the ionising radiation exposure in children. For parents, the website offers basic information brochures that can be printed or downloaded that describe what an X ray is, what are its risks and benefits, and what can be done to decrease these risks. A call to action has been published advocating a reduction of ionising radiation exposure to children by delivering the right imaging exam, the right way with the right dose.

== Reed's rules ==
Reed's rules are a set of guidelines developed by Joseph O. Reed in interpretation of pediatric radiology:

1. On every chest film, read the abdominal portion as you would read an abdominal film.
2. Knowledge of anatomy is the key to correct radiographic diagnosis.
3. The airway should be visible on all normal chest films.
4. A mass must be seen in two planes.
5. An esophagram must be done on any child with unexplained respiratory disease.
6. In unilateral hyperexpansion of the lungs, you must see how the air moves. Mediastinal position is critical to this determination.
7. Always review all old films to assess new ones properly. Subtle findings can be missed easily when a single previous examination is reviewed.
8. The abdominal examination should include a minimum of three views—supine, prone and erect.
9. On every abdominal examination, evaluate the chest as if you were looking at a chest film.
10. In obstruction of the lumen, there should be proximal distention.
11. During intravenous urography, keep taking films as long as you are getting needed information.
12. Try to find the effects of the mass on adjacent organs on each abdominal film. Draw the mass, if necessary.
13. After you have defined the mass, find the center of the lesion. Then consider all structures, gross and microscopic, near the center of the lesion as possible sources of the mass. Think skin to skin.
14. The periosteum is not normally seen.
15. When viewing an extremity, try to imagine the appearance of the patient. An excellent example is bowed legs or knock knees.

== Artificial Intelligence ==
In recent years, artificial intelligence (AI) has emerged as a tool to support these radiation reduction goals while also improving diagnostic accuracy. Most AI systems in radiology have been developed using images from adult patients. Due to this adult-focused training, these AI models present challenges when applying them to children whose anatomy is significantly different.

Fracture detection: One of the most common uses of AI in paediatric radiology is for detecting fractures. Commercial software such as RBFracture and BoneView can analyse X-rays and alert radiologists by pointing out possible broken bones. Studies show these AI tools can correctly identify 85-92% of fractures in children. However, this accuracy depends on the specific body part being examined. The paediatric patients' elbow is particularly challenging because children have ossification centres, which are small areas of bone that are still in development and appear at different ages. On an X-ray image, these normal growth areas can look similar to fracture lines, causing the AI systems to flag healthy, normal elbows as fractured or injured.

Age-related challenges: AI tools trained on adult models tend to perform worse on younger children. Studies comparing AI accuracy across age groups have found a significant decrease in performance with children under six years old. This is a shared concern among the paediatric radiology specialty because younger children are more vulnerable to the consequences of a missed diagnosis. They are also more sensitive to radiation if additional imaging is needed. Researchers have identified the large lack of paediatric image databases in comparison to adults, as a key barrier to further improving AI performance for this age group.

Radiation dose reduction: As discussed above, reducing radiation exposure is a priority in the paediatric imaging field. AI-based noise reduction technology offers a solution by clearing up image quality digitally, which allows radiographers to use lower radiations doses while still capturing clear images. This supports the ALARA principle (As Low As Reasonably Achievable), which is the standard approach for maintaining radiation exposure as minimum as possible. Some studies testing these tools on paediatric chest X-rays have confirmed that images processed by AI remain useful for diagnosing even at reduced dose levels.

Clinical decision support: AI is also being developed to help doctors decide which imaging test to order. Choosing the wrong test can expose a child to unnecessary radiation or delay a diagnosis. AI models trained on medical imaging guidelines have been evaluated for recommending appropriate tests. In simulated scenarios, these systems performed at an expert-level accuracy in selecting the right imaging approach.

Current research: A 2025 review examined 789 published studies on AI in paediatric radiology. The review found that most of the research comes from China and the United States. Of these studies, 91% of them focus solely on image interpretation rather than real-world implementation. This bias raises questions about whether AI tools that have been developed in well-resourced settings will work reliably in hospitals with different patient populations or equipments.

== Equipment ==
Equipment adapted for use in paediatric radiology may include artificial windows or light panels. Positioning equipment such as constraints, sponges, and weights are commonly utilised. An example of positioning equipment for X ray scans on infants is the Pigg-O-Stat baby tube. Most equipment is used the same for adult imaging, but maintaining lower doses and an exposure setting adapted for children.

== Paediatric radiology training ==
In some countries, paediatric radiology does not legally require a specific training to practice. Where there is, paediatric radiologists must complete a diagnostic radiology residency (4 years), then finalize a pediatric radiology fellowship (1-2 years) before they are eligible to take the board examination for official subspecialty certification (e.g. Canada, UK, Switzerland, USA). This then qualifies them in the specialised area of paediatric radiology.

== Common paediatric pathologies requiring imaging ==
- Wilms' tumour
- Leukaemia
- Teratoma
- Congenital abnormalities
- Osteosarcoma
- Meningitis
- Infant respiratory distress syndrome
- Juvenile idiopathic arthritis
- Greenstick fractures

== See also ==
- Radiology
- Paediatrics
- Medical imaging
- EOS (medical imaging)
