= American Board of Radiology =

Independent, not-for-profit professional association

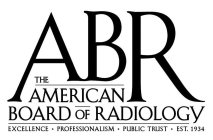

Established in 1934, the American Board of Radiology (ABR) is an independent, not-for-profit professional association with headquarters in Tucson, Arizona. It oversees the certification and ongoing professional development of physician specialists in diagnostic radiology, interventional radiology, and radiation oncology, as well as medical physicists in diagnostic, nuclear, and therapy medical physics.

In 1935, William E. Allen, Jr. became the first African American certified by the Board. And in 1962, Sarah Ewell Payton became the first African-American woman certified.

The ABR certifies its diplomates through a comprehensive process involving educational requirements, professional peer evaluation, and examination.

== See also ==
- American Osteopathic Board of Radiology
- American Board of Medical Specialties
- American Board of Science in Nuclear Medicine
