= Allied health professionals =

Classification of health professions

Allied health professionals (AHPs) are a category of health professionals that provide a range of diagnostic, preventive, therapeutic, and rehabilitative services in connection with health care. While there is no international standard for defining the diversity of allied health professions, they are typically considered those which are distinct from the fields of medicine, nursing and dentistry.

In providing care to patients with certain illnesses, AHPs may work in the public or private sector, in hospitals or in other types of facilities, and often in clinical collaboration with other providers having complementary scopes of practice. Allied health professions are usually of smaller size proportional to physicians and nurses. It has been estimated that approximately 30% of the total health workforce worldwide are AHPs.

In most jurisdictions, AHPs are subject to health professional requisites including minimum standards for education, regulation and licensing. They must work based on scientific principles and within an evidence-based practice model. They may sometimes be considered to perform the role of mid-level practitioners, when having an advanced education and training to diagnose and treat patients, but not the certification of a physician. Allied health professionals are different from alternative medicine practitioners, also sometimes called natural healers, who work outside the conventions of modern biomedicine.

== Definition ==
The organization of International Chief Health Professions Officers (ICHPO) developed a widely used definition of the allied health professions:

Allied Health Professions are a distinct group of health professionals who apply their expertise to prevent disease transmission, diagnose, treat and rehabilitate people of all ages and all specialties. Together with a range of technical and support staff they may deliver direct patient care, rehabilitation, treatment, diagnostics and health improvement interventions to restore and maintain optimal physical, sensory, psychological, cognitive and social functions.

== Professions ==
The allied health professions represent a large cluster of health and care service providers, which usually require specific training and/or certification, but which are distinct from the medicine, nursing and dentistry professions. There is a large demand for allied health professionals, especially in rural and medically underserved areas. AHPs are generally considered distinct from other healthcare service providers on the basis of several factors. These factors may include AHPs offering services in ways which support treatments provided by other healthcare professionals (working either in independent autonomous practice or under direct supervision), or by offering services which other healthcare professionals require but do not provide themselves (for example in the use of medical technologies).

The precise titles, roles and requisites of AHPs vary considerably from country to country. For the United States, a generic definition is in the Public Health Service Act, including those with "training, in a science relating to health care, [and] who shares in the responsibility for the delivery of health care services or related services" (other than a registered nurse or physician assistant). In South Africa, AHPs are identified and regulated through the Health Professions Council of South Africa (e.g., clinical technologists, dental therapists) or through the Allied Health Professions Council (e.g., massage therapists, chiropractors).

Depending on the country and local health care system, the professions that are considered AHPs vary. For example, in some contexts optometrists are not considered AHPs, as the profession has a longer history of primary care practice independent of modern medicine, whereas in others optometrists are identified as falling under the AHP umbrella. Similarly, in some health care jurisdictions physiotherapists are not considered AHPs, as they tend to have more autonomy in private practice without the need for medical referral, whereas in other jurisdictions physiotherapists are identified and regulated as AHPs.

A limited subset of the following professional areas may be represented, and may be regulated:

- Anesthesia technician
- Anesthesiologist assistant
- Art therapist
- Athletic trainer
- Audiologist
- Autotransfusionist
- Cardiovascular technologist
- Clinical psychologist
- Clinical social worker
- Communicative disorders assistant
- Dental assistant
- Dental hygienist
- Dental therapist
- Denturist / clinical dental technician
- Dietitian / nutritionist
- Environmental health officer / public health inspector
- Exercise physiologist
- Healthcare technician
- Lactation consultant
- Massage therapist
- Medical assistant
- Medical interpreter
- Medical laboratory professional
- Medical physicist
- Medical radiation scientist
- Mental health counselor / psychotherapist
- Midwife
- Music therapist
- Occupational therapist
- Operating department practitioner
- Orthoptist
- Orthotist / prosthetist
- Paramedic
- Pathologists' Assistant
- Pedorthist
- Perfusionist
- Pharmacy technician
- Phlebotomist
- Physiotherapist / physical therapist
- Radiographer / radiology technologist / mammographer / angiographer
- Radiotherapist / radiation therapist / medical dosimetrist
- Recreational therapist
- Rehabilitation counselor
- Renal dialysis technologist
- Respiratory therapist
- Sonographer
- Speech and language pathologist
- Surgical technologist

== Training and education ==
Some allied health professions are more specialized, and so must adhere to national training and education standards and their professional scope of practice. Often they must prove their skills through degrees, diplomas, certified credentials, and continuing education. Other allied health professions require no special training or credentials and are trained for their work by their employer through on-the-job training (which would then exclude them from consideration as an allied health profession in a country like Australia). Many allied health jobs are considered career ladder jobs because of the opportunities for advancement within specific fields.

Allied health professions can include the use of many skills. Depending on the profession, these may include basic life support; medical terminology, acronyms and spelling; basics of medical law and ethics; understanding of human relations; interpersonal communication skills; counseling skills; computer literacy; ability to document healthcare information; interviewing skills; and proficiency in word processing; database management and electronic dictation.

== History and growth ==
The explosion of scientific knowledge that followed World War II brought increasingly sophisticated and complex medical diagnostic and treatment procedures. Increasing public demand for medical services combined with higher health care costs provoked a trend toward expansion of service delivery from treating patients in hospitals to widespread provision of care in physician's private and group practices, ambulatory medical and emergency clinics, and mobile clinics and community-based care.

Changes in the health industry and emphasis on cost-efficient solutions to health care delivery will continue to encourage expansion of the allied health workforce. The World Health Organization estimates there is currently a worldwide shortage of about 2 million allied health professionals (considering all health workers aside from medical and nursing personnel) needed in order to meet global health goals.

In recognition of the growth of the number and diversity of allied health professionals in recent years, the 2008 version of the International Standard Classification of Occupations increased the number of groups dedicated to allied health professions. Depending on the presumed skill level, they may either be identified as "health professionals" or "health associate professionals". For example, new categories have been created for delineating "paramedical practitioners"—grouping professions such as clinical officers, clinical associates, physician assistants, Feldshers, and assistant medical officers—as well as for community health workers; dietitians and nutritionists; audiologists and speech therapists; and others.

In developing countries, many national human resources for health strategic plans and international development initiatives are focusing on scaling up training of allied health professions, such as HIV/AIDS counsellors, clinical officers and community health workers, in providing essential preventive and treatment services in ambulatory and community-based care settings.

With growing demand for ambulatory health care, researchers expect to witness a heavier demand for professions that are employed outside of hospital settings — including allied health.

== Examples ==
=== India ===
In India, the National Commission for Allied and Healthcare Professions identifies and sets quality standards for 56 'Allied health professionals' and 'Healthcare professionals' in diagnostics, therapeutics, community health, and biomedical technology (e.g., Physiotherapists, Optometrists, Dietician, etc).

=== United Kingdom ===
In the United Kingdom there are 14 distinct professions who are considered allied health professionals; in combination they account for about 6% of the NHS workforce. In 2013 the annual expenditure on services provided by allied health professionals amounted to around £2 billion, although there is a lack of evidence around the extent to which these services improve the quality of care.

=== United States ===
In the United States, the Association of Schools of Allied Health Professionals uses wording from the Public Health Service Act to list those who are considered to be allied health professionals.

==== Employment projections ====
Projections in the United States and many other countries have shown an expected long-term shortage of qualified workers to fill many allied health positions. This is primarily due to expansion of the health industry due to demographic changes (a growing and aging population), large numbers of health workers nearing retirement, the industry's need to be cost efficient, and a lack of sufficient investment in training programs to keep pace with these trends.

Studies have also pointed to the need for increased diversity in the allied health workforce to realize a culturally competent health system.

Workforce and health care experts anticipate that health services will increasingly be delivered via ambulatory and nursing care settings rather than in hospitals. According to the North American Industry Classification System (NAICS), the health care industry consists of four main sub-sectors, divided by the types of services provided at each facility:

- Hospitals: primarily provides inpatient health services and may provide some outpatient services as a secondary activity.
- Ambulatory health care settings: primarily provides outpatient services at facilities such as doctors' offices, outpatient clinics and clinical laboratories.
- Nursing and residential care facilities: provides residential care, such as community care for the elderly or mental health and substance abuse facilities.
- Social Assistance: provides services for the elderly and/or disabled, services for the homeless and poor, vocational rehabilitation, or child day care services.

In the US, a larger proportion of the allied health care workforce is already employed in ambulatory settings. In California, nearly half (49.4 percent) of the allied health workforce is employed in ambulatory health care settings, compared with 28.7 percent and 21.9 percent employed in hospital and nursing care, respectively. One source reported allied health professionals making up 60 percent of the total US health workforce. Advancements in medical technology also allow for more services that formerly required expensive hospital stays to be delivered via ambulatory care. For example, in California, research has predicted the total consumption of hospital days per person will decline from 4 days in 2010 to 3.2 days in 2020 to 2.5 days in 2030. In contrast, the number of ambulatory visits per person will increase from 3.2 visits per person in 2010 to 3.6 visits per person in 2020 to 4.2 visits in 2030.

== See also ==
- Health care providers
- Human resources for health
- List of medical abbreviations
- Paramedicine
- Unlicensed assistive personnel
