= Azin Alizadehasl =

Iranian academic

- Born: 1975 (age 50–51); Urmia, Iran
- Citizenship: Iranian
- Education: Professor of Cardiology, Echocardiologist, Cardio-Oncologist
- Occupations: Pioneer and Head of Cardio-Oncology Department & Research Center
- Awards: Silver Medal in world Olympiad of Chemistry in Italy (February 1992); International Doody’s Core Titles Award for Practical Cardiology Book; Book-authority selected author for 100 Best Cardiology Books of All Time

Azin Alizadehasl (Persian: آذین علیزاده اصل, born 1975) is an Iranian Professor of Cardiology, Echocardiologist and Cardio-Oncologist. She is the pioneer and head of the Cardio-Oncology Department and Research Center and a faculty member at the Rajaie Heart Center in Tehran, Iran. She is also a fellow of the American Society of Echocardiography, nd has held a Member-at-Large position on the ASE Guidelines and Standards Committee since 2020. Additionally, she is a fellow of the American College of Cardiology.

== Early life ==
Azin Alizadehasl was born in 1975 in Urmia, Iran. She is an Iranian Professor of Cardiology, Echocardiologist and Cardio-Oncologist. Currently, she is the pioneer and head of Cardio-Oncology Department and Research Center at Rajaie Heart Center in Tehran, Iran. She is also a fellow of the American Society of Echocardiography. She studied general medicine at Tabriz University of Medical Sciences from 1993 to 2000 and is board-certified in cardiology from Iran and Tabriz University of Medical Sciences. In February 1992, she earned a (silver medal) in the World Chemistry Olympiad in Italy; ranked second in the Cardiovascular Residency Program Exam in Iran in 2002, and placed in the top 10% of the Iranian Cardiology Board Exam in 2006. She received the International Doody’s Core Titles Award for her Practical Cardiology Book and was recognized by BookAuthority as an author of one of the 100 Best Cardiology Books of All Time.

== Career ==
Alizadeasl founded the first Cardio-Oncology clinic and Department in Iran at the Shaheed Rajaie Cardiovascular Medical and Research Center, which is also the first Cardio-Oncology clinic, educational, and research center in the Middle East. She is the author and editor of numerous national and international books published by esteemed publishing companies such as Elsevier, Springer, Cambridge and Jaypee. She introduced an innovation in the field of echocardiography known as "Holter Echocardiography" and developed an accepted innovation called "A Polypill for the Prevention of Cardiotoxicity," which includes Carvedilol, Lisinopril, Aldactone, and Atorvastatin. This polypill was recognized by the Research Deputy of the Iranian Ministry of Health. Additionally, she introduced an approved innovation in the form of a modified TEE probe surface designed to prevent the adhesion of macromolecules (such as saliva).

== Bibliography ==
Some books written by Alizadehasl:

- Comprehensive Approach to Adult Congenital Heart Disease, Springer Publishing Company; Anita Sadeghpour, Majid Kiavar, Azin Alizadehasl. 2014
- Multimodal Imaging Atlas of Cardiac Masses, Elsevier Publishing Company, Azin Alizadehasl and Majid Maleki, In press, 2022
- Practical Cardiology Principles and Approaches, Elsevier Publishing Company, Majid Maleki, Azin Alizadehasl, Majid Haghjoo, 2017
- Chemotherapy Cardiovascular Considerations; Drug Manual, Azin Alizadehasl, Mohammad Vaezi, Ehsan Ferasati, ... et al. 1400.
- Color Atlas of Cardiology- Challenging Cases, Jaypee Publishing Company. 2017, Majid Maleki, Azin Alizadehasl.
- Case based textbook of Echocardiography, Springer UK, Anita Sadeghpour, Azin Alizadehasl. 2018
- Practical Cardiology Principles and Approaches, 2nd Edition, Elsevier Publishing Company, Majid Maleki, Azin Alizadehasl, Majid Haghjoo, 2021
- Cardiac radiation toxicity: clinical and practical point, Azin Alizadehasl et al, 1400
- Atlas of Echocardiography in Pediatrics and Congenital Heart Diseases
- Case-Based Clinical Cardiology
