= Radiation therapist =

Health professional

Radiation Therapist
Occupation
- Names: Therapy Radiographer; Radiographer; Radiologic Technologist; Radiation Therapist
- Occupation type: Professional
- Activity sectors: Allied health profession

Description
- Competencies: The use of ionising radiation to treat several diseases, mostly cancer
- Education required: Usually an undergraduate degree (BSc, B.Sc. or A.Sc.); see "Qualifications & Registration" for more information.
- Fields of employment: Healthcare, Military, Radiotherapy departments, Oncology departments
- Related jobs: Radiographer; Radiation oncologist

A radiation therapist, therapeutic radiographer or radiotherapist is an allied health professional who works in the field of radiation oncology. Radiation therapists plan and administer radiation treatments to cancer patients in most Western countries including the United Kingdom, Australia, most European countries, and Canada, where the minimum education requirement is often a baccalaureate degree or postgraduate degrees in radiation therapy. Radiation therapists (with master's and doctoral degrees) can also prescribe medications and radiation, interpret tests results, perform follow ups, reviews, and provide consultations to cancer patients in the United Kingdom and Ontario, Canada (possibly in Australia and New Zealand in the future as well). In the United States, radiation therapists have a lower educational requirement (at least an associate degree of art, though many graduate with a bachelor's degree) and often require postgraduate education and certification (CMD, certified medical dosimetrist) in order to plan treatments.

== Roles & Responsibilities ==
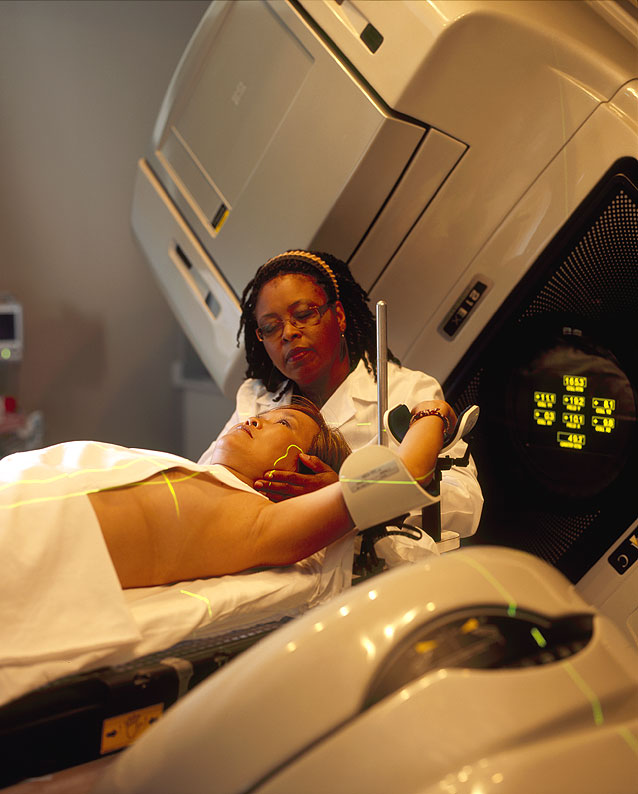
A woman is being prepared for radiation therapy by a radiation therapist.

Radiation therapists use advanced computer systems to operate sophisticated radiation therapy equipment such as linear accelerators. The therapist works closely with the radiation oncologists, medical physicists and other members of the health care team. They effectively design and treat the course of radiation treatment, in addition to managing the patient's well-being. Radiation therapists primarily treat cancer although certain other conditions may require irradiation. After the radiation oncologist has consulted with the patient and a decision has been reached that the application of radiation will benefit the patient, it then becomes the responsibility of the radiation therapist to interpret the prescription and develop a treatment plan for treatment delivery. The process of producing the final plan rests with a group of specialized radiation therapists called dosimetrists.

Since the course of radiation therapy can extend over several weeks, the radiation therapist is responsible for monitoring the condition of the patient and assessing if changes to the treatment plan are required. This is accomplished through patient re-positioning, dose calculations or other specialized methods to compensate for the changes. The therapist is responsible for quality assurance of the radiation treatment. This involves acquiring and recording all parameters needed to deliver the treatment accurately. The therapist first ensures that the patient is correctly set up for treatment; this may involve immobilization and surface-marker alignment with lasers. The therapist takes imaging studies of the targeted treatment area and reproduces the patient positioning and plan parameters daily. The therapist is responsible for the accuracy of the treatment and uses their judgment to ensure quality with regard to all aspects of treatment delivery. During the course of radiation treatment, the patient is likely to develop side effects. In such situations, the therapists will communicate these side effects with the radiation oncologist, who may adjust treatment or give medications; in some jurisdictions, specialist radiation therapists may prescribe these medications themselves. Radiation therapists & medical dosimetrists (in many countries these two professions are often indistinguishable, e.g., Canada, Australia, New Zealand, and the UK) have training in gross anatomy, physiology, radiation protection, and medical physics. They are highly skilled, highly regarded health care professionals who are integral members of the cancer care team. Radiation therapists call upon their judgment to either continue or cease radiation treatment and ensure patient safety at all times and are regulated by a governing body within their jurisdiction.

=== United Kingdom ===
Therapeutic radiographers play a vital role in the treatment of cancer as the only healthcare professionals qualified to plan and deliver radiotherapy. Radiotherapy is used either on its own or in combination with surgery and/or chemotherapy. They manage the patient pathway through the many radiotherapy processes, as outlined below, providing care and support for patients throughout their radiotherapy treatment.

Therapeutic radiographers are trained in all the many aspects of radiotherapy including:

Simulation - using specialist x-ray fluoroscopy machines to target the area to be treated whilst minimising the amount of exposure to surrounding healthy tissue;

CT/MR Simulation - producing scans to be used for the planning of a course of radiotherapy;

Computer planning - producing a 3D plan of the dose distribution across the area to be treated;

External beam treatment - using ionizing radiation, such as high-energy x-rays, the radiographer delivers accurate doses of radiation to the tumour;

Mold Room - radiographers and technicians in the Mold Room produce immobilization/beam attenuation devices for those receiving radiotherapy to the head or neck, as well as other custom devices for a patient's treatment;

Brachytherapy - the use of small radioactive sources placed on or in tumors to treat to a high dose while avoiding normal tissues;

On treatment review - radiation therapists regularly assess patients while they are undergoing radiotherapy, prescribing drugs to counteract side effects where necessary or referring them on to other health professionals if needed.*

=== Canada ===
Specialist radiation therapists in Ontario are given with prescription rights. Some of the roles of the CSRT (Clinical Specialist Radiation Therapist) include pain management specialists, mycosis fungoides specialists, palliative care specialists, planning image definition, and contouring specialists.*

== Qualifications & Registration ==
Vary by Country.

=== Canada ===
In Canada, most radiation therapy programs are second entry and the majority of the students have had at least one full year of university courses before entering the programs (many have finished a science or physics degree). In Alberta, a BScRT (Bachelor of Science Radiation Therapy) is being offered at the University of Alberta. In Ontario, a BSRT (Bachelor of Science Radiation Therapy) is being offered at the University of Toronto and Laurentian University, and a BMRSc (Bachelor of Medical Radiation Science) in Radiation Therapy is being offered at McMaster University. In British Columbia, British Columbia Institute of Technology offers a BT (Bachelor of Technology) in Radiation Therapy. In Manitoba, the University of Winnipeg is offering a BSc Physics (Radiation Therapy). And in New Brunswick, the University of New Brunswick offers a BHSc (Bachelor of Health Science) in Radiation Therapy. In Quebec Radiation Oncology technology is offered in three year cegep programs. The CAMRT certifies therapists across Canada, but certain provinces, like Quebec, do not require the national certification if practitioners are certified with the provincial body. The first Master of Health Science (Radiation Therapy) in Canada is being offered at the University of Toronto, which prepares practitioners for advanced roles in the radiation therapy clinic.

In Canada, there is no real distinction between Radiation Therapists and Medical Dosimetry. The title "treatment planner", or just "planner" commonly replaces "dosimetrist". Dosimetrists are commonly radiation therapists with several years of experience and have undergone in-house training. The national professional association has recently introduced a Dosimetry Specialty Certificate program to address the fact there is no specific credential (DSp). Many employers recognize the Certified Medical Dosimetrist qualification from the US (Certified Medical Dosimetrist, CMD), but neither are required for practice.

=== Australia ===
A bachelor or graduate degree in radiation therapy is required in order to register and practice. In Australia, radiation therapists are often being addressed as "Medical Radiation Practitioners" or "Medical radiation scientists".

=== Malta ===
Bachelor (Hons) degree in Radiography

=== New Zealand ===
A bachelor's degree in radiation therapy is required in order to practice and be registered by the Medical Radiation Technologist Board (www.mrtboard.org.nz). Post graduate opportunities in advanced practice, Msc. and doctoral programmes are also available for Radiation Therapists in New Zealand.

=== Ireland ===
To practice as a radiation therapist in Ireland, a degree in Radiation Therapy that has been validated by the Irish Institute of Radiography and Radiation Therapy (http://www.iirrt.ie) is required. Taught and research MSc. and doctoral programmes are also available for Radiation Therapists in the Ireland.

=== United Kingdom ===
In the UK an approved course in Therapeutic Radiography must be undertaken prior to registration by the UK regulatory authority, the Health and Care Professions Council. This will usually be in the form of a Bachelor of Science degree in Therapeutic Radiography, Radiotherapy, or Radiotherapy and Oncology, however a small number of post-graduate pre-registration courses (at Post-graduate diploma or Masters level) are offered. UK radiographers are eligible for membership of the Society & College of Radiographers.

Post-graduate studies at Masters level (PgD and MSc) are available, where graduates from such programs can move into Advanced Practice roles and can undertake duties previously done by physicians. Practitioners can build further on their skills and knowledge to work as Consultant Radiographers, who are considered as experts in clinical practice, research, education and leadership in their area of expertise, and will often possess a PhD or equivalent award.

=== United States ===
The minimum Education requirement is an associate degree of science, some programs offer bachelor or master's degrees of science. In addition, there are also alternate pathways to becoming certified in the form of secondary degrees. These certifications are one year programs which require another degree, such as radiologic technology.

=== Chile ===
A bachelor's degree and a 5-year college study program is required. By law (DS-18), in order to practice, at least 6 months of clinical demonstrable experience and a performance authorization is also required.

== Salary ==
In 2008, the mean annual wage of radiation therapists in the United States was $78,290 according to the National Occupational Employment and Wage Estimates from the United States Department of Labor - Bureau of Labor Statistics.

According to ASRT's national wage survey done in 2003, the state that had the highest mean income for radiation therapists was New Mexico($120,250), followed by Arkansas ($109,000). The states which had the lowest average pays were Texas ($57,500) and Rhode Island ($58,400).

The average salary of American board certified medical dosimetrists is well over $100,000 according to the AAMD salary report. The typical salary range is from $90,000 (South) to $130,000 (West coast).

== See also ==
- Radiation Therapy
- Medical Physics
- Radiographer
