= American Society of Radiologic Technologists =

The American Society of Radiologic Technologists (ASRT) is a professional membership association that serves medical imaging technologists, radiation therapists, and radiologic science students. The organization, located in Albuquerque, New Mexico provides its members with ongoing education and professional development opportunities.

ASRT makes provision for members to specialize in various areas of radiologic technology such as computed tomography, mammography, magnetic resonance imaging, and nuclear medicine. The organization also monitors state and federal legislation that may impact the profession, and works closely with other organizations to establish standards of practice and develop educational curricula.

ASRT is governed by an elected Board of Directors and a House of Delegates, and has affiliate relationships with 54 state or local societies. These affiliated societies operate independently, but ASRT provides them with assistance and guidance upon request.

ASRT provides radiologic technologists with the knowledge, resources, and support they need to provide quality patient care. The organization's efforts to promote professional development, support legislative advocacy, and establish standards of practice make it a respected and trustworthy resource for radiologic technologists.

== Early history ==
Within six months of Röntgen's discovery of the x-ray in 1895, physicians were using x-rays to diagnose and treat illness by physicians. However, it didn't take long for physicians to realize that to make the most effective use of their x-ray equipment, someone else had to handle the time-consuming tasks of performing x-ray examinations and developing films.^{2}

The first x-ray technicians had a heavy load to bear. The vast majority were women, and they were expected not only to operate the x-ray equipment, but also to perform routine machine maintenance.^{3} These first technicians also worked in a climate indifferent to radiation protection, and the death toll among them was high. It wasn't until nearly 20 years after Roentgen's discovery that precautions such as lead aprons and film badges came into widespread use.^{4}

Because instructional manuals were rare, the first technicians learned positioning and exposure techniques via the "hunch method."^{5} Despite this, many x-ray technicians were able to achieve what were then considered to be remarkable radiographic images. With no written rules, however, they found it difficult to explain their successes and could not formulate a technique that others could follow.

The plight of the x-ray technician was largely ignored until the 1920s, when the persistent work of one man — Eddy C. Jerman — finally brought education, organization and legitimacy to the x-ray technician.

In October 1920, Jerman and 13 technician acquaintances — half of whom were women — met in Chicago to establish the first national technicians society, the American Association of Radiological Technicians. The society was created "for the purpose of affording technicians an opportunity for the interchange of thoughts and ideas concerned with radiologic technique."^{6}

The new society offered knowledge-hungry technologists the opportunity to meet and share technical advice. This process was formalized in 1929 with the debut of the society's journal, The X-Ray Technician.

In 1930, the organization was renamed to the American Society of Radiographers. By 1932, when the association changed its name to the American Society of X-Ray Technicians, membership had reached nearly 400. Membership figures remained stable through the Depression, but surged following World War II when hundreds of military-trained radiographers returned home from the war to find jobs in civilian hospitals. The rapid increase in membership prompted the society to hire its first full-time staff person, Genevieve Eilert. In 1946, the ASXT established its headquarters in the basement of Mrs. Eilert's home in Fond du Lac, Wis. ASXT membership climbed to 2,500 in 1948 and reached 4,000 in 1952.

In the early 1950s, the ASXT made its first foray into establishing formal educational standards for the profession. Until then, training programs varied greatly in length and in the subjects covered. The ASXT presented its first standardized curriculum in 1952. It described a one-year course in x-ray technology and recommended the number of hours that should be devoted to each subject, ranging from physics and anatomy to positioning and darkroom technique. The 1952 curriculum was the first of many that the society would publish over the years as it consistently pushed for uniform educational standards for radiologic technologists.

In 1964, the association changed its name from the American Society of X-Ray Technicians to the American Society of Radiologic Technologists. The change was spurred because more and more of the society's members were nuclear medicine technologists and radiation therapists, so the term “x-ray technician” no longer accurately reflected the membership. In addition, members believed the shift from “technician” to “technologist” placed a stronger emphasis on professionalism and education. The same year, the society also changed the name of its journal to Radiologic Technology.

The ASRT continued to grow, and by 1968 membership had reached 14,000. The organization's leaders realized it was time to move the burgeoning society from Fond du Lac, the ASRT's headquarters for more than two decades. They chose Chicago, home to nearly 100 other health care associations.

== Recent history ==
The late 1960s and early 1970s were a tumultuous time for the profession and for ASRT. The explosion in new technology caused a severe shortage of radiologic technologists nationwide. Once-exotic procedures such as computed tomography, mammography and sonography were becoming commonplace, and demand soared for personnel qualified to operate the equipment. Fearing that the shortage would lead to “diploma mills” that churned out technologists with little formal training, the ASRT began promoting more rigorous educational requirements and minimum national standards for medical imaging and radiation therapy personnel.

In 1968, ASRT asked the federal government to establish standards regulating the licensure of radiologic technologists. At the time, the U.S. Public Health Service estimated that there were more than 100,000 operators of x-ray equipment in the country, but only about 55,000 were certified. The ASRT supported a bill that proposed standards for the licensure of radiologic technologists. Following the issuance of the standards, states would have two years either to adopt them or to enact their own, more stringent, standards. In 1970, only four states licensed radiologic technologists.

The Consumer-Patient Radiation Health and Safety bill, as the proposed legislation was titled, had strong opponents who exerted significant political pressure. The bill was reintroduced year after year in Congress but never made it out of committee. As the ASRT continued to fight for passage of the federal bill, it also worked with the states to enact licensure laws. By 1979, nine states licensed radiologic technologists.

Finally, in 1981, Congress passed the Consumer-Patient Radiation Health and Safety Act. The Secretary of Health and Human Services was ordered to develop federal standards for the certification of radiologic technologists and the accreditation of educational programs in the radiologic sciences. The Act also required the federal government to provide the states with a model statute for licensure. However, the Act made compliance voluntary and did not impose penalties for states that ignored the standards.

The ASRT regarded enactment of the law a partial victory. In the years following its passage, increasing numbers of states began licensing radiologic technologists. By 1995, 33 states had enacted licensure laws for radiographers, 28 licensed radiation therapists and 21 licensed nuclear medicine technologists. By 2010, 39 states licensed radiographers, 34 licensed radiation therapists and 28 licensed nuclear medicine technologists.

While ASRT was working in the 1970s for regulatory standards on the governmental level, it also was introducing the profession to the concept of continuing education. In 1975, the ASRT designed a voluntary continuing education program in which technologists could earn CE points by participating in professional meetings, in-service education and self-study programs. Although voluntary, response to the CE program was strong. Within a year of its launch, more than 5,000 radiologic technologists had enrolled – a testament to their eagerness for continuing education.

By the early 1980s, the ASRT was focused on ensuring long-term financial stability for the organization while expanding its range of benefits and services to members. To do so, the organization recognized that it needed to leave Chicago. The ASRT's downtown Chicago office was the organization's single largest expense, leaving no money for investments or for future expansion of the society.

After a nationwide search, the ASRT chose Albuquerque, N.M., as its new home. Estimating that the society would be able to operate for nearly half the cost as in Chicago, it opened its office in Albuquerque in August 1983. Within four years of relocating, the ASRT went from having almost no savings to having more than $2.5 million in securities and investments.

In 1995, the American Registry of Radiologic Technologists (ARRT) made continuing education mandatory as a condition for the annual renewal of technologists’ certification. The CE requirement had a broad impact on ASRT and its members. Although the society had offered educational materials through its annual meeting and journals since its inception in 1920, the CE mandate put the society under additional pressure to help R.T.s satisfy the ARRT requirement to earn 24 CE credits every two years. It responded by becoming one of the few organizations approved by the ARRT to perform all four CE responsibilities: developing, sponsoring and evaluating CE activities and recording technologists’ accumulated CE credits.

ASRT membership climbed from 28,500 in 1994 to 56,000 in 1996 and 70,000 in 1998. One of the efforts that benefited from ASRT's increasing size and strength was the battle for federal minimum standards. This effort was reinvigorated in 1998, when the ASRT sought to amend the 1981 Consumer-Patient Radiation Health and Safety Act to make compliance by the states mandatory. The ASRT formed a Government Relations Department, launched an exhaustive grass-roots lobbying effort and built a coalition with other radiologic science organizations to gain support for the issue on Capitol Hill.

The coalition's work led to the introduction of the Consumer Assurance of Radiologic Excellence bill (CARE bill) eight times in the House of Representatives – in 2000 by Rep. Rick Lazio, R-N.Y.; in 2001 and 2003 by Rep. Heather Wilson, R-N.M.; in 2005 by Rep. Chip Pickering, R-Miss.; in 2007 by Rep. Mike Doyle, D-Pa.; in 2009 and 2011 by Rep. John Barrow, D-Ga.; and in 2013 by Rep. Ed Whitfield, R-Ky. The bill also was introduced in the Senate in 2003, 2005, 2007, 2009, 2012 and 2013 by Sen. Michael Enzi, R-Wyo. It passed the Senate unanimously in December 2006, but the House adjourned before it could take action on the bill.

When it was reintroduced in both houses of Congress during 2007, the bill had a slightly different name. Although the acronym was still CARE, it stood for Consistency, Accuracy, Responsibility and Excellence in Medical Imaging and Radiation Therapy. In 2014, the ASRT shifted its efforts to establish educational and certification standards from the federal level to the state level. By 2015, only five states remained that did not have any standards for personnel performing medical imaging or delivering radiation therapy.

In response to increased concern by the public over patient radiation dose, the ASRT along with The American College of Radiology, The American Association of Physicists in Medicine and the Society for Pediatric Radiology developed and launched the Image Gently Campaign which is designed to maintain high quality imaging studies while using the lowest doses and best radiation safety practices available on pediatric patients. This initiative has been endorsed and applied by a growing list of various Professional Medical organizations around the world and has received support and assistance from companies that manufacture equipment used in radiology.

Following upon the success of the Image Gently campaign, the ASRT, the American College of Radiology, the Radiological Society of North America and the American Association of Physicists in Medicine have launched a similar campaign to address this issue in the adult population called Image Wisely.

== Meetings ==
The ASRT conducts three educational meetings annually. Each June, it hosts an Educational Symposium that offers multiple tracks. Each fall, ASRT conducts a Radiation Therapy Conference in conjunction with the annual meeting of the American Society for Radiation Oncology. Educational courses at this conference focus on radiation therapy and medical dosimetry. In late November or early December, it conducts the ASRT@RSNA meeting, which offers educational courses for technologists who attend the Radiological Society of North America meeting.

== Publications ==
The ASRT publishes two peer-reviewed research journals. The bimonthly journal Radiologic Technology keeps readers informed about advances in technology and patient care. It also offers ASRT members the opportunity to earn continuing education credit through its Directed Reading program. Radiation Therapist, published twice a year, focuses on technical advances in radiation oncology. It, too, features a Directed Reading program. ASRT Scanner is the society's member magazine. In addition, the ASRT operates a website which contains news, information about the profession, educational material for patients and a variety of professional resources for radiologic technologists.

• Career Resources. The Society tracks members’ continuing education activities and maintains a CE record for each member that can be submitted as proof of continuing education. It conducts regular salary surveys of the profession, providing valuable information about income levels and trends.

• Advocacy and Representation. The ASRT monitors and responds to all legislation that affects the profession and coordinates with other organizations to establish legal minimum standards to ensure high quality patient care. The ASRT also works to educate the public about the role of radiographers in providing quality patient care and patient safety in diagnostic imaging. The ASRT is currently advocating for the passage of Senate Bill 2412, or the Protecting Access to Lifesaving Screening (PALS) Act of 2021. This bill will delay instructions that would restrict women under the age of 50 from receiving mammograms from the United States Preventive Services Task Force (USPSTF), which control medical payments. The PALS Act of 2021 aims to block the USPSTF from enforcing these instructions until January 1, 2028, and lower the age in which women can benefit from receiving mammograms to 40.

• Professional Issues. The ASRT works with volunteers to develop and revise educational curricula, professional standards and practice guidelines for radiologic technologists and radiation therapists. The ASRT represents the profession in the governmental, educational and research arenas and was recently instrumental in the development of the registered radiologist assistant (R.R.A.), an advanced scope of practice for radiologic technologists.
