= Society of Radiographers =

UK trade union

SOR / COR / SCoR
- Society and College of Radiographers
- Founded: 1920
- Headquarters: London, England
- Location: United Kingdom
- Members: ▲33,971 (2024)
- Key people: President - Gill Hodges BSc (Hons); President Elect - Chris Kalinka DCR DRI MSc BSc; Vice President - Claire Donaldson DCR BSc; Chief Executive Officer - Mr R Evans HDCR OBE; Head of Professional Policy Professor - Mrs C Beardmore FCR MBA (Open) DMS BSc (Hons) DCR(R) & (T); Head of Industrial Strategy - Mr W Town MA DCR(T) DLS; Head of Finance and Operations - Mr D Manek
- Affiliations: EFRS, ISRRT, NICE TUC, PARN, STUC, WRETF
- Website: www.sor.org

The Society of Radiographers (SoR) is a professional body and trade union that represents more than 90 percent of the diagnostic and therapeutic radiographers in the United Kingdom. The College of Radiographers (CoR) is a charitable subsidiary of the Society, they are collectively known as the Society and College of Radiographers (SCoR).

It was founded in 1920 in an effort to provide standardised training and registration for Radiographers within the British Isles. Until 1996, the SoR was also the professional body and trades union for radiographers in Ireland whereupon the Irish Institute of Radiography and Radiation Therapy was established.

== History ==
In the second decade of the 20th century the number of x-ray workers grew dramatically not least due to the impact of World War I and in post-war Britain the formation of an association of such workers was inevitable. This was hastened by the desire of medical practitioners (radiologists) to secure the 'ownership' of x-ray work and leading radiologists at the time approached the Institute of Electrical Engineers for support. As a result the Society of Radiographers was established in 1920 with its first council composed of six radiologists and six electrical engineers, to which were added six selected radiographers from the London area.

In 1921, a syllabus was developed and examinations were introduced to facilitate competency checks before membership was granted to new members. The first batch to qualify for membership included Kathleen Clark who would establish rigour in the profession. Membership began to grow with 67 members in 1921 and 164 in 1923.

The medical members with external assistance attempted to prevent radiographers from reporting on their images. This was to be a crucial step along the road to medical ownership of x-ray work and to establish consultant posts in radiology. It was in 1925 that there was agreement that non-medical members would not report and if they did they would be liable to dismissal from the society. There was opposition to this from some radiographer council members especially Mr Blake but also from the Electrical Engineers representatives. In fact they resigned en-masse including A A Campbell Swinton is said to be the first person in the UK to produce a radiograph.

After this there followed a long period of medical dominance. It was not until the 1970s that Dr Swinburne, a radiologist, from Leeds said it was time for official recognition that radiographers assist in film interpretations. It was another 20 years before the first reporting courses for radiographers were established. By 1997 it was official policy of the College of Radiographers that "reporting by radiographers is not an option. For the future, it is a requirement."

The society formed a South African branch in 1930 and established a pattern of branch formation with a local committee management which was propagated in the UK during the 1930s. As a result, the Scottish Radiographic Society which was formed in 1927 became a branch of the society in 1936, the South West Branch in 1937, the North West in 1942, the Midland and the North East in 1943. The first Annual Conference of the Society of Radiographers was in 1947 held at Bath, England.

In June 2015, the National Institute for Health and Care Excellence (NICE) granted accreditation to the processes used by the SCoR in order to generate current clinical guidance for Radiography practice, meaning that the SCoR is NICE accredited.

== Objectives ==
The objectives for which The Society of Radiographers is established are as follows:

- To promote and develop for the public benefit the science and practice of radiography and radiotherapeutic technology and allied subjects;
- To promote, study and research work in radiography and radiotherapeutic technology and allied subjects and to publish the results of all such study and research;
- To further public education therein;
- To protect the honour and interests of persons engaged in the practice of radiography and radiotherapeutic technology and allied subjects including the regulation of relations between such persons and employers and employers' associations;
- To further all such objects which a trade union may lawfully pursue in accordance with statute.

The college's objectives are directed towards education, research and other activities in support of the science and practice of radiography.

== Governance ==
The society and college is led by a council which is made-up of representatives from a number of English regions (Eastern region, London region, Midlands region, North West region, Northern region, South East region, South West region, Yorkshire & North Trent region) and from Northern Ireland, Scotland and Wales. The Council determines the Society's policy and strategic direction in consultation with members and others that have a vested interest. It meets once a month, with the exception of August and December.

The society is a company limited by guarantee and the members of council are company directors registered at Companies House. The college, a registered charity, has its own Board of directors comprising an equal number of members drawn from council and external directors representing the legal, financial and medical fields. They have responsibilities as representatives of the membership and also as directors of the company. Neither council members nor College Board members are paid for their duties but they can claim travelling and other expenses.

The president is elected by the members of council and is inaugurated at the July council meeting each year. There is also a President-elect and a Vice-president, who also serve for one year.

=== Past leadership ===
Year	President	President Elect	Vice President	Chief Executive Officer	Head of Professional Policy Professor	Head of Industrial Strategy	Head of Finance and Operations
2019/2020	Gill Hodges BSc (Hons)	Chris Kalinka DCR DRI MSc BSc	Claire Donaldson DCR BSc	Mr R Evans; OBE HDCR	Mrs C Beardmore DCR, MBA (Open) DMS BSc (Hons) DCR (R) & (T)	Mr W Town; MA DCR(T) DLS	Mr D Manek
2018/2019	Sue Webb BSc (Hons)	Gill Hodges BSc (Hons)	Chris Kalinka DCR DRI MSc BSc	Mr R Evans; OBE HDCR	Mrs C Beardmore DCR, MBA (Open) DMS BSc (Hons) DCR (R) & (T)	Mr W Town; MA DCR(T) DLS	Mr D Goulds; MBA FCMA FCIS
2017/2018	Mr G Thomas MSc BSc (Hons) PgCUTL FHEA	Sue Webb BSc (Hons)	Gill Hodges BSc (Hons)	Mr R Evans; OBE HDCR	Mrs C Beardmore DCR, MBA (Open) DMS BSc (Hons) DCR (R) & (T)	Mr W Town; MA DCR(T) DLS	Mr D Goulds; MBA FCMA FCIS
2016/2017	Mr Steve Herring BSc (Hons) PgD	Mr G Thomas MSc BSc (Hons) PgCUTL FHEA	Sue Webb BSc (Hons)	Mr R Evans; OBE HDCR	Mrs C Beardmore DCR, MBA (Open) DMS BSc (Hons) DCR (R) & (T)	Mr W Town; MA DCR(T) DLS	Mr D Goulds; MBA FCMA FCIS
2015/2016	Mrs S Hassan DCR(T)	Mr Steve Herring BSc (Hons) PgD	Mr G Thomas MSc BSc (Hons) PgCUTL FHEA	Mr R Evans; OBE HDCR	Mrs C Beardmore DCR, MBA (Open) DMS BSc (Hons) DCR (R) & (T)	Mr W Town; MA DCR(T) DLS	Mr D Goulds; MBA FCMA FCIS
2014/15	Mrs K Smith; MSc DCR(T)	Mrs S Hassan; DCR(T)	Mr S Herring; BSc (Hons) PgD	Mr R Evans; OBE HDCR	Professor A Paterson; OBE FCR MSc TDCR DMU	Mr W Town; MA DCR(T) DLS	Mr D Goulds; MBA FCMA FCIS
2013/14	Mrs P Black; DCR(R) NVQ PgDip	Mrs K Smith; MSc DCR(T)	Mrs S Hassan; DCR(T)	Mr R Evans; OBE HDCR	Professor A Paterson; OBE FCR MSc TDCR DMU	Mr W Town; MA DCR(T) DLS	Mr D Goulds; MBA FCMA FCIS
2012/13	Mrs Jackie Hughes; DCR(R)	Mrs Pam Black; DCR(R) NVQ PGDip	Mrs Karen Smith; DCR(T) MSc	Mr R Evans; OBE HDCR	Professor A Paterson; OBE FCR MSc TDCR DMU	Mr W Town; MA DCR(T) DLS	Mr D Goulds; MBA FCMA FCIS
2011/12	Mrs S Johnson; MA BSc(Hons) DCR(R) PgC	Mrs Jackie Hughes; DCR(R)	Mrs Pam Black; DCR(R)NVQ PgDip	Mr R Evans; OBE HDCR	Professor A Paterson; OBE MSc TDCR DMU FCR	Mr W Town; MA DCR(T) DLS	Mr N Williams; FCA

=== Patron ===
The patron of the Society and College of Radiographers is The Rt Hon Llinos "Llin" Golding, Baroness Golding of Newcastle-under-Lyme who is a Labour Party politician and former MP who sits in the House of Lords and who previously practiced as a radiographer.

== Education and other activities ==
Historically, the college was an awarding body for academic awards but no longer fulfils this function. The degree-equivalent radiography qualification awarded by the CoR was the Diploma of the College of Radiographers (DCR) and this was awarded following a three-year training course and successful completion of a national examination, either in Radiodiagnosis (the DCR(R)) or in Therapy Radiography (the DCR(T)). Following study equivalent to Masters level, students with a DCR could proceed by examination to the Higher Diploma of the College of Radiographers (HDCR). Holders of the HDCR undergoing specialist training in management were awarded the Management Diploma of the College of Radiographers (MDCR) and those undergoing specialist training in the teaching of radiography were awarded the Teaching Diploma of the College of Radiographers (TDCR). The first Bachelor of Science (BSc) in Radiography was validated in 1989 and with the widespread introduction of BSc courses in radiography during 1993, the DCR was phased out. The HRCR, TDCR and MDCR have been replaced by postgraduate level courses.

The college maintains an Accreditation and Approval Board which aims to protect patients of radiographers by raising the standards of education and practice. It does so by monitoring and assessing programmes of both pre-registration degree courses and ongoing professional education ranging from ad-hoc events to professional postgraduate training. The college runs courses and conferences. Various guidances and guidelines are published by the CoR often in conjunction with the Institute of Physics and Engineering in Medicine (IPEM), the Royal College of Radiologists (RCR), the British Institute of Radiology (BIR) and the Royal College of Nursing (RCN).

Research grants are awarded by the college. An academic library is maintained. Further activities to promote the public interest includes the provision of advice to the public and to government and government agencies and activities to promote public awareness of radiography, radiology and oncology. Information on the activities of the CoR is published on the website of the UK's Charity Commission.

== Trade Union activities ==
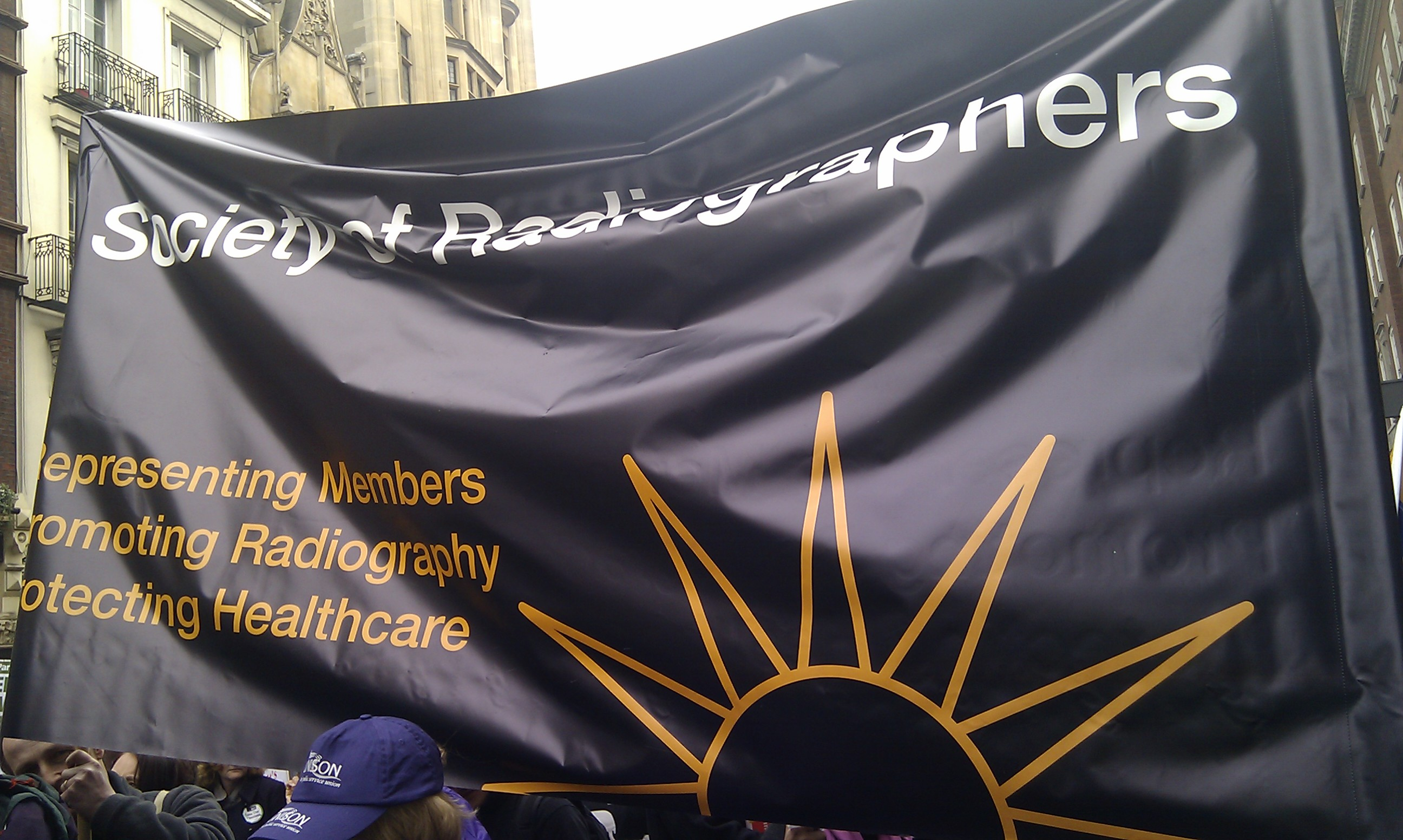
An example of a SoR banner in a trade union demonstration (2011)

The society has a membership base throughout the United Kingdom. As such, the Trade Union is associated with the Trades Union Congress (TUC) in the United Kingdom and with the Scottish Trades Union Congress (STUC). The organisation was previously associated with the Irish Congress of Trade Unions(ICTU) but it left in 2013 citing financial constraints as the reason. In 2003, before leaving and whilst still in affliction with the ICTU, the society opposed a motion to restrict affiliation of small unions with the ICTU stating that the motion was "about bureaucracy."

== The Society of Radiographers Benevolent Fund ==
The Society of Radiographers Benevolent Fund is a registered charity (No. 326398) and it assists SoR members, former members and their families in times of hardship or distress and in particular the old, the sick and the incapacitated among members and former members. Information on the activities of the Benevolent Fund is published on the website of the UK's Charity Commission.

== Publications ==
The SCoR issues a number of publications:

Imaging and Therapy Practice
Imaging and Therapy Practice provides in-depth coverage of the latest professional and educational issues that affect the day-to-day working lives of therapy and diagnostic radiographers. The publication was known as Synergy: Imaging and Therapy Practice up until January 2013. The editor is Melanie Armstrong.
Synergy News
Synergy News is a news digest of what is happening in radiography and the wider healthcare arena. Topics reported include role development and career progression, pay and conditions, research, Continuing Professional Development and health and safety and equality issues. The editor is Jan Metcalf.
Radiography
Radiography is an international, English language, peer-reviewed journal of diagnostic imaging and radiation therapy. The editor is Professor Julie Nightingale.
Imaging & Oncology
An annual title published to coincide with the United Kingdom Radiology Congress. The editor is Dr Ruth Strudwick.

== Controversies ==
- In 2024, Society of Radiographers issued guidelines to NHS hospitals to start asking all male patients aged 12 to 55 if they were pregnant. This policy was instated as part of an 'inclusivity' drive and received a lot of criticism from the public.

== Awards ==
The SCoR maintains a number of awards and grants.

=== Fellowship of The College of Radiographers (FCR) Award ===
The Fellowship of the College of Radiographers (FCR) is an honorary title, bestowed upon individuals who have made significant contribution to the radiographic profession. It was first awarded, in its present format, in 1978 following the establishment of The College of Radiographers as the charitable subsidiary of The Society of Radiographers. Additionally, the individual receives complimentary life membership of The Society of Radiographers.

=== The Gold Medal Award ===
The Gold Medal is the highest award the Society may award and is only granted to individuals who have "who have made exceptional contributions to radiography, developed the profession and advanced the Society and College of Radiographers." Fewer than 20 gold medals have ever been awarded.

=== The Silver Medal Award ===
The Silver Medal was first struck in 1985 and is awarded by The Society of Radiographers to recognise and acknowledge individuals for outstanding dedication and contribution to the profession of Radiography. Nominees must be members of the Society of Radiographers (or retired from active service and membership), or non-members who are outstanding contributors to the profession. Their work may span any aspect of the imaging and therapy modalities and/or the wider spheres of commerce, industry and management; as such overseas nominees are also eligible. Notable recipients include Stewart Whiteley who was the author for the revised editions of Clark's positioning in Radiography, a fundamental diagnostic radiography textbook.

=== Alan Nichols Memorial Award ===
Alan Nichols was a chief technical adviser to the Department of Radiology at Oxford Hospitals and since 1996, an award in his name has been given for the best paper proffered by a radiographer at the Radiology Congress. A representative of the Mr Nichols's family is invited to present the award. The Alan Nichols Memorial Award is currently £100.

=== Beth Whittaker Award ===
This award, commemorating Beth Whittaker, has been awarded to the best poster presentation at the Annual Radiology Conference. The Beth Whittaker Award is currently £50.

=== SoR Reps' Learning Fund (Bryan Macey Scholarship) ===
The Bryan Macey Scholarship, named for a former Chief Executive, is open to all Society Health and Safety and Industrial Relations representatives for trade union-related academic study.

=== Forder Memorial Award for Students ===
The Forder Memorial Award, which commemorates the memory of Mr A O Forder, founder member of the SoR in 1920 and a member of the first council of the society. From 1995, it was agreed that it would be presented to the best paper proffered by a student at the Annual Students Conference. The winning student is awarded the prize of £50.

=== The Arthur Kay Radiotherapy Award ===
In April 2009, the organisation launched the Arthur Kay Radiotherapy Award to support an annual award to an appropriately qualified and experienced therapeutic radiographer who wishes to travel to learn new and innovative techniques in therapeutic radiography. The fund will enable successful applicants to spend time studying innovations in technology and practice at a leading world class cancer institution(s). Applications for funding to the value of £5000 will be considered although, for exceptional applications, more may be available to an absolute maximum of £10,000.

=== Overseas Placement Fund ===
The College of Radiographers Overseas Placement Fund was established in 1998. It is managed by the College of Radiographers Board of Trustees and a number of radiography placements in developing countries have been supported by the fund. A number of individual radiographers have taken an interest in this area and this has often resulted in periods of working overseas.

== Arms ==
Coat of arms of Society of Radiographers

Notes
Granted 3 May 1951
Crest
On a rim Or a white owl Proper holding with the dexter claw a rod of Aesculapius Gold.
Escutcheon
Azure a sun in his splendour Or on a chief Sable a saltire Argent surmounted by a rod of Aesculapius Proper.

== See also ==
- Royal College of Radiologists
- ISRRT
