= Radiography (journal) =

- Discipline: Radiography, medical imaging
- Language: English
- Edited by: Julie Nightingale

Publication details
- History: 1995-present
- Publisher: Elsevier, on behalf of the Society and College of Radiographers and the European Federation of Radiographer Societies
- Frequency: 5/year
- Open access: Hybrid

Standard abbreviations
- ISO 4: Radiography

Indexing
- ISSN: 1078-8174 (print); 1532-2831 (web)
- OCLC no.: 252429231

Links
- Journal homepage; Online access; Online archive; Journal page at publisher's website

Radiography is a peer-reviewed medical journal covering diagnostic and therapeutic radiography. The journal is published by Elsevier and was established in 1995. The founding editor-in-chief was H. Brian Bentley from 1995 until 2003. The current editor-in-chief is Julie Nightingale (University of Salford). The journal was preceded by an insert in the British Journal of Radiology starting in 1927. In 1935, the current journal's predecessor, which was also known as Radiography was first published. It is the official journal of the Society and College of Radiographers and the European Federation of Radiographer Societies. Besides regular issues, the journal occasionally publishes special issues.

== Abstracting and indexing ==
The journal is abstracted and indexed in:

- CINAHL
- Embase/Excerpta Medica
- INIS Atomindex
- Sociedad Iberoamericana de Información Científica (SIIC)
- Scopus
