= American Society of Echocardiography =

The American Society of Echocardiography (ASE) is a professional organization of physicians, cardiac sonographers, nurses and scientists involved in echocardiography, the use of ultrasound to image the heart and vascular system. The organization was founded in 1975 and has more than 17,000 members nationally and internationally. The American Society of Echocardiography promotes cardiovascular ultrasound and its application to patient care through education, advocacy, research, innovation and service. The society also provides research grants and scholarships to support advances in cardiovascular care.

ASE's membership consists of physicians, cardiac sonographers, nurses, physical scientists, lab managers, and students.

ASE has created numerous guidelines regarding the use of echocardiography including monitoring heart dysfunction after chemotherapy. A mobile app developed by ASE called iASE has been rated as one of the top echocardiography apps

ASE joined Choosing Wisely in 2013 to reduce unnecessary medical testing with echocardiography.
