= International Society of Radiographers and Radiological Technologists =

Radiological Society

- Founded: 1959; 67 years ago
- Type: Society
- Members: 200,000

International Society of Radiographers and Radiological Technologists (ISRRT) is a non-governmental organization formed in 1959 which aims to give direction to the Radiological profession as a whole through collaboration with national representative bodies. ISRRT is working with the World Health Organization. It represents more than 65 member countries and 200,000 radiographers as members.

== History ==
In July 1959 at the 9th International Congress of Radiology, an organization was formed as International Secretariat of Radiographers and Radiological Technicians in Munich, Germany. Its name was then changed to International Society of Radiographers and Radiological Technicians in August 1962. Later, in 1992, the name was changed to International Society of Radiographers and Radiological Technologists.

== Structure ==
It is run by the Society of Radiographers in the London Borough of Southwark.

== Daughter organizations ==
- Malaysian Society Of Radiographers.

== See also ==
- National Council on Radiation Protection and Measurements
- Society for Radiological Protection
