= Radiographer =

Healthcare professional

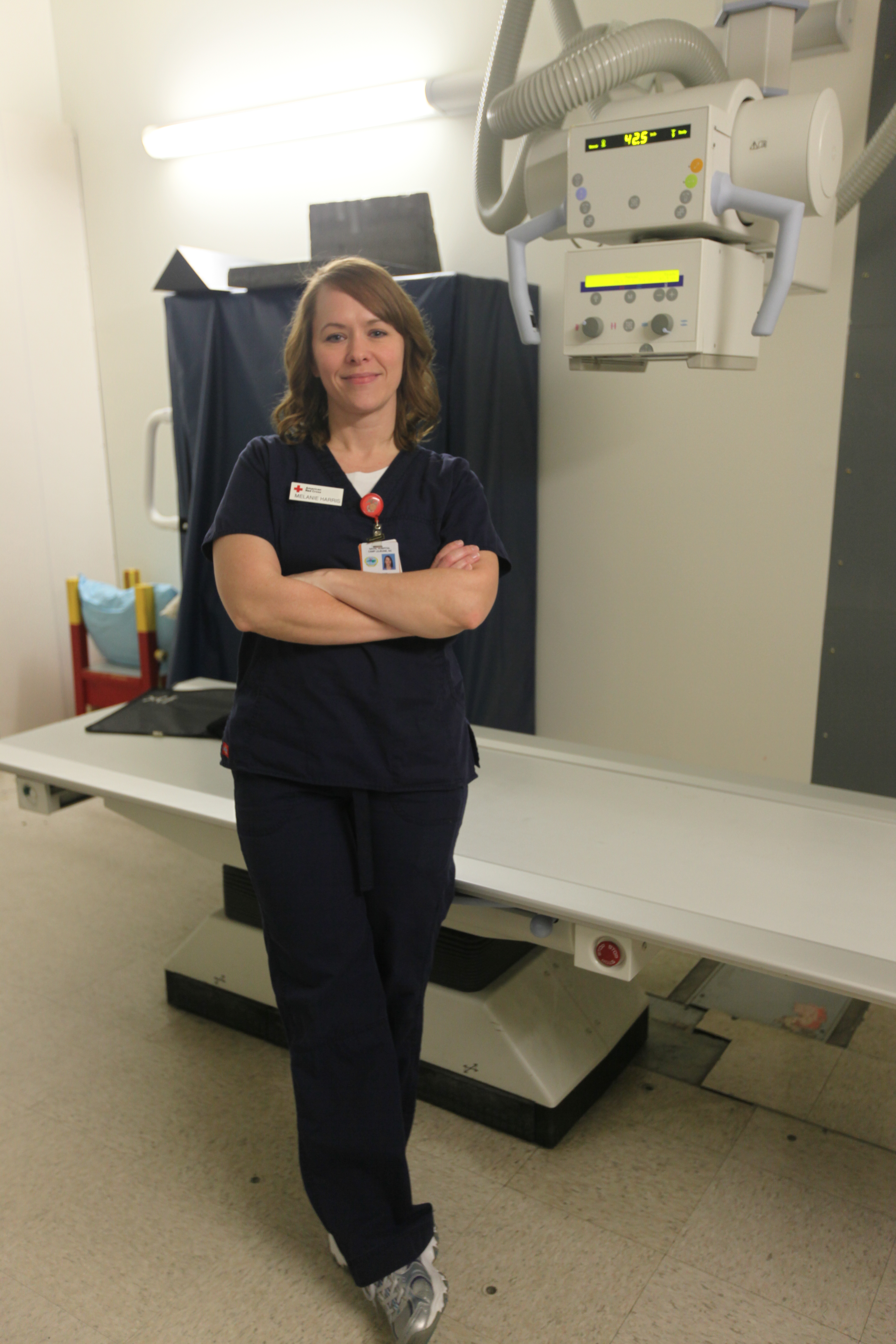
- A radiographer with a radiographic examination table and X-Ray tube

Occupation
- Names: Radiographer, Diagnostic Radiographer, therapeutic Radiographer, Radiologic Technologist
- Occupation type: Professional
- Activity sectors: Allied health profession

Description
- Competencies: Performing medical imaging and radiation therapy
- Education required: Usually an bachelor degree, master degree, associate degree for less developed countries
- Fields of employment: Healthcare, Military, Medical Imaging, Radiation therapy, Radiology

Radiographers (radiologic technologists) are healthcare professionals who perform medical imaging and radiation therapy. Medical imaging is used for the diagnosis of pathology, while radiation therapy is used for treatment.

The duties and responsibilities of a radiographer include performing radiographic examinations, arranging radiographic examination projections with precision, carrying out radiotherapy procedures for disease treatment, being responsible for the radiation dose delivered to patients, conducting nuclear medicine examinations, managing and utilising radioactive substances including radiopharmaceuticals, implementing radiation protection measures to ensure the safety of patients and healthcare workers, as well as educating and explaining to patients about the procedures to be performed.

== Work environment ==
Radiographers are allied health professionals who work in both public healthcare and private healthcare, and can be physically located in a range of clinical settings that provide diagnostic imaging or radiation therapy services — most frequently in dedicated diagnostic imaging departments or radiation therapy departments within hospitals. The practice varies from country to country and can even vary between hospitals in the same country.

== Professional organizations ==
Radiographers are represented by a variety of organizations worldwide, including the International Society of Radiographers and Radiological Technologists which aim to give direction to the profession as a whole through collaboration with national representative bodies.

== History ==
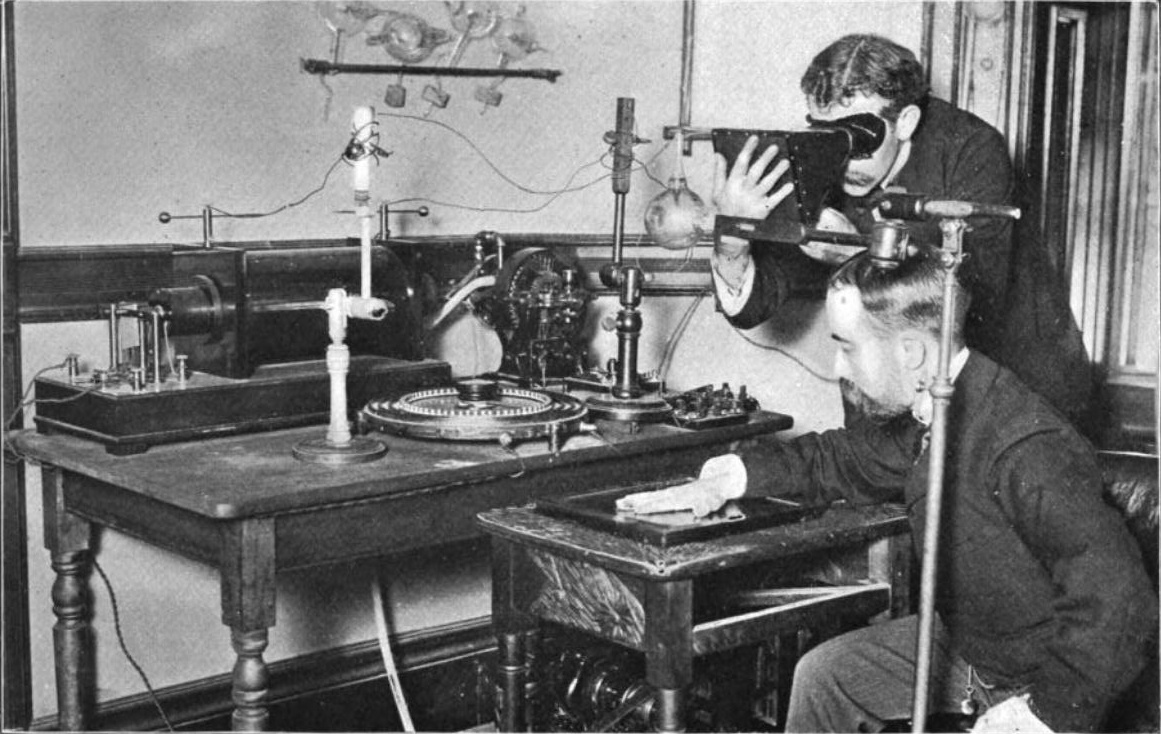
Taking an X-ray image with early Crookes tube apparatus, late 1800s

For the first three decades of medical imaging's existence (1897 to the 1930s), there was no standardized differentiation between the roles that we now differentiate as radiologic technologist (a technician in an allied health professions who obtains the images) versus radiologist (a physician who interprets them). By the 1930s and 1940s, as it became increasingly apparent that proper interpretation of the images required not only a physician but also one who was specifically trained and experienced in doing so, the differentiation between the roles was formalized. Simultaneously, it also became increasingly true that just as a radiologic technologist cannot do the radiologist's job, the radiologist also cannot do the radiologic technologist's job, as it requires knowledge, skills, experience, and certifications that are specific to it.

Radiography's origins and fluoroscopy's origins can both be traced to 8 November 1895, when German physics professor Wilhelm Röntgen discovered the X-ray and noted that, while it could pass through human tissue, it could not pass through bone or metal. Röntgen referred to the radiation as "X", to indicate that it was an unknown type of radiation. He received the first Nobel Prize in Physics for his discovery.

There are conflicting accounts of his discovery because Röntgen had his lab notes burned after his death, but this is a likely reconstruction by his biographers: Röntgen was investigating cathode rays using a fluorescent screen painted with barium platinocyanide and a Crookes tube which he had wrapped in black cardboard to shield its fluorescent glow. He noticed a faint green glow from the screen, about 1 metre away. Röntgen realized some invisible rays coming from the tube were passing through the cardboard to make the screen glow: they were passing through an opaque object to affect the film behind it.

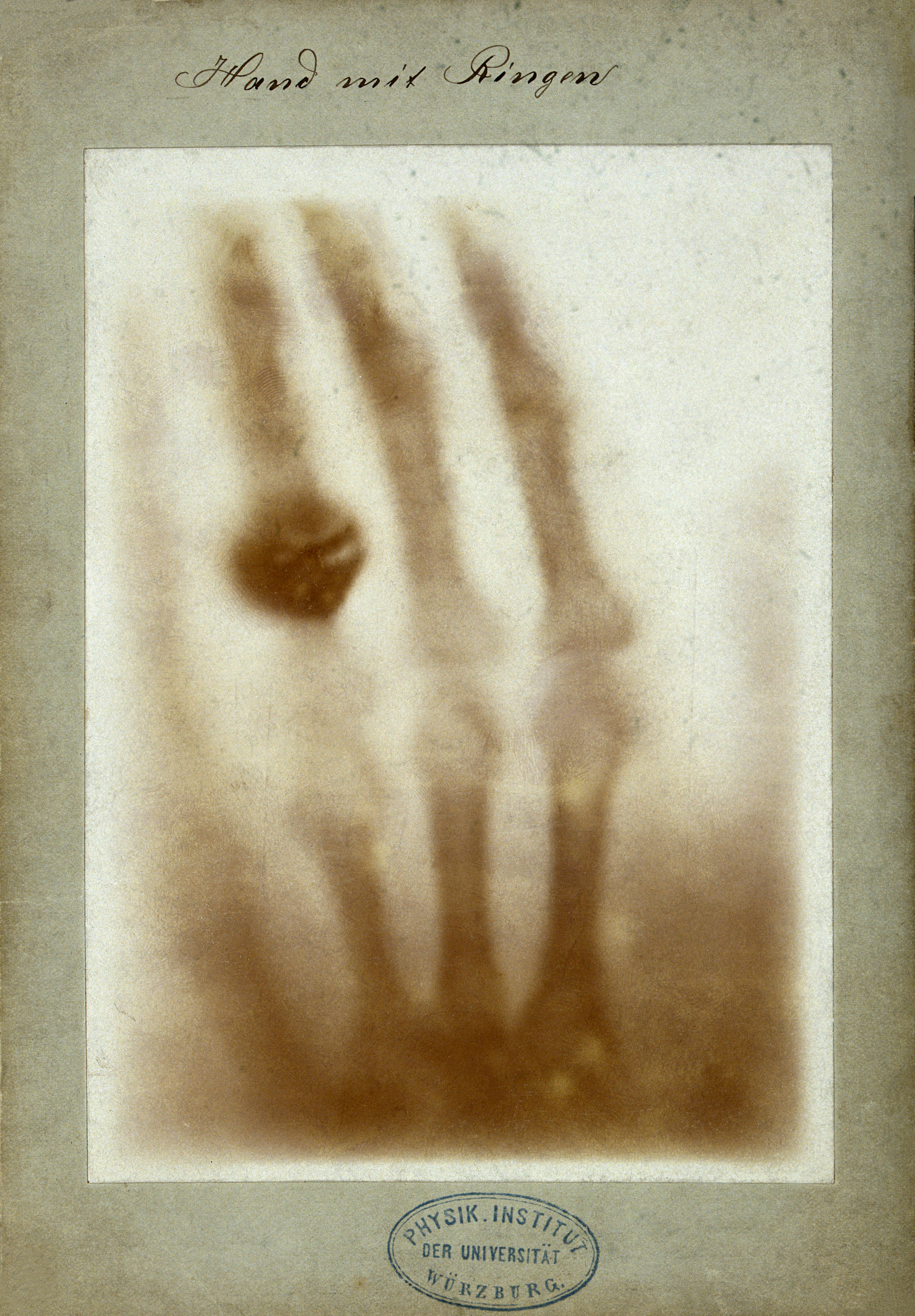
The first radiograph

Röntgen discovered X-rays' medical use when he made a picture of his wife's hand on a photographic plate formed due to X-rays. The photograph of his wife's hand was the first ever photograph of a human body part using X-rays. When she saw the picture, she said, "I have seen my death."

The first use of X-rays under clinical conditions was by John Hall-Edwards in Birmingham, England on 11 January 1896, when he radiographed a needle stuck in the hand of an associate. On 14 February 1896, Hall-Edwards also became the first to use X-rays in a surgical operation.

The United States saw its first medical X-ray obtained using a discharge tube of Ivan Pulyui's design. In January 1896, on reading of Röntgen's discovery, Frank Austin of Dartmouth College tested all of the discharge tubes in the physics laboratory and found that only the Pulyui tube produced X-rays. This was a result of Pulyui's inclusion of an oblique "target" of mica, used for holding samples of fluorescent material, within the tube. On 3 February 1896 Gilman Frost, professor of medicine at the college, and his brother Edwin Frost, professor of physics, exposed the wrist of Eddie McCarthy, whom Gilman had treated some weeks earlier for a fracture, to the X-rays and collected the resulting image of the broken bone on gelatin photographic plates obtained from Howard Langill, a local photographer also interested in Röntgen's work.

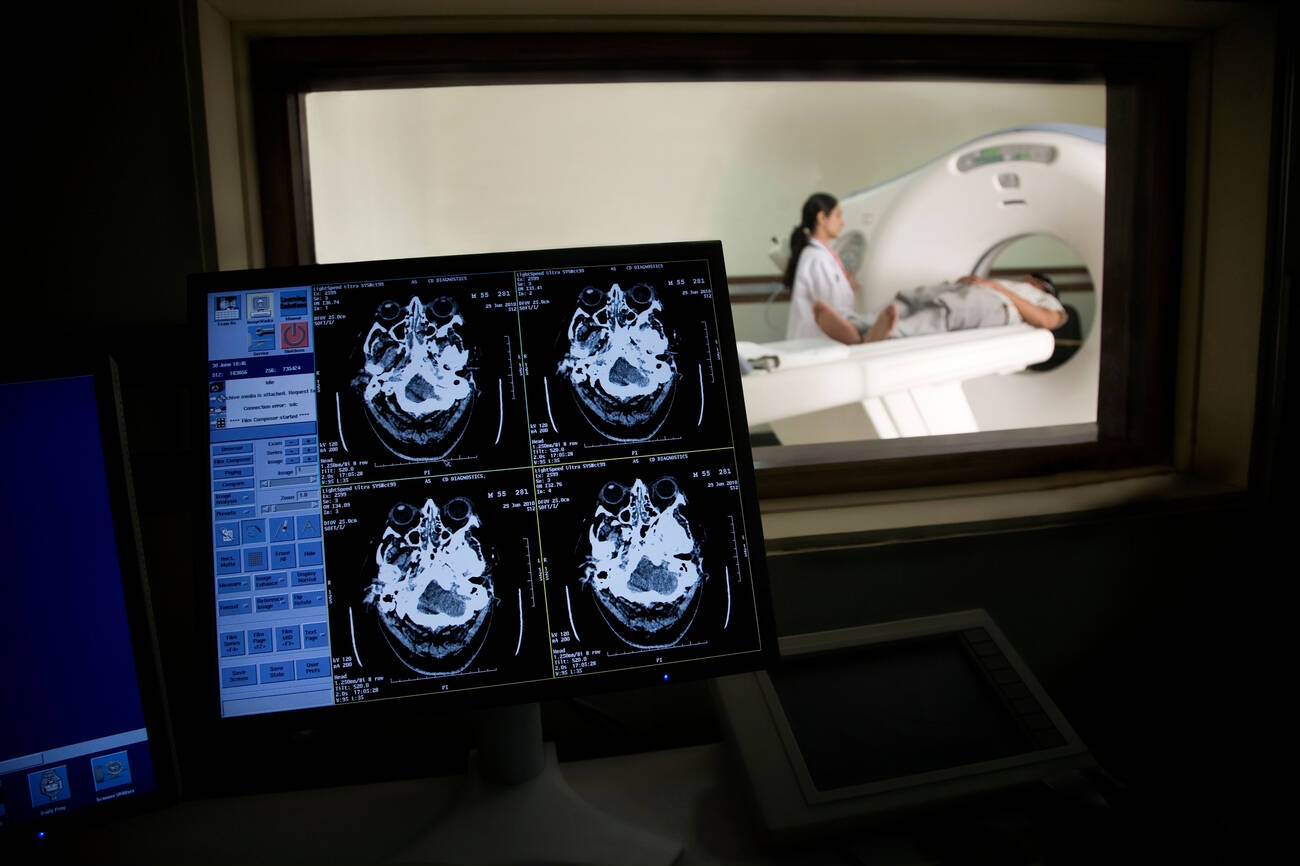
A modern diagnostic radiology acquisition console. The evolution of allied health roles has expanded a radiographer's clinical domain to include advanced computed tomography (CT) slice profiling and multiplanar volume reconstruction.

X-rays were put to diagnostic use very early; for example, Alan Archibald Campbell-Swinton opened a radiographic laboratory in the United Kingdom in 1896, before the dangers of ionizing radiation were discovered. Indeed, Marie Curie pushed for radiography to be used to treat wounded soldiers in World War I. Initially, many kinds of staff conducted radiography in hospitals, including physicists, photographers, physicians, nurses, and engineers. The medical speciality of radiology grew up over many years around the new technology. When new diagnostic tests were developed, it was natural for the radiographers to be trained in and to adopt this new technology. Radiographers now perform fluoroscopy, computed tomography, mammography, ultrasound, nuclear medicine and magnetic resonance imaging as well. Although a nonspecialist dictionary might define radiography quite narrowly as "taking X-ray images", this has long been only part of the work of "X-ray Departments", Radiographers, and Radiologists. Initially, radiographs were known as roentgenograms, while Skiagrapher (from the Ancient Greek words for "shadow" and "writer") was used until about 1918 to mean Radiographer.

The history of magnetic resonance imaging includes many researchers who have discovered NMR and described its underlying physics, but it is regarded to be invented by Paul C. Lauterbur in September 1971; he published the theory behind it in March 1973. The factors leading to image contrast (differences in tissue relaxation time values) had been described nearly 20 years earlier by Erik Odeblad (doctor and scientist) and Gunnar Lindström.

In 1950, spin echoes and free induction decay were first detected by Erwin Hahn and in 1952, Herman Carr produced a one-dimensional NMR spectrum as reported in his Harvard PhD thesis. In the Soviet Union, Vladislav Ivanov filed (in 1960) a document with the USSR State Committee for Inventions and Discovery at Leningrad for a Magnetic Resonance Imaging device, although this was not approved until the 1970s.

By 1959, Jay Singer had studied blood flow by NMR relaxation time measurements of blood in living humans. Such measurements were not introduced into common medical practice until the mid-1980s, although a patent for a whole-body NMR machine to measure blood flow in the human body was already filed by Alexander Ganssen in early 1967.

In the 1960s and 1970s the results of a very large amount of work on relaxation, diffusion, and chemical exchange of water in cells and tissues of various types appeared in the scientific literature. In 1967, Ligon reported the measurement of NMR relaxation of water in the arms of living human subjects. In 1968, Jackson and Langham published the first NMR signals from a living animal.

== Role in healthcare ==
A radiographer uses their expertise and knowledge of patient care, physics, human anatomy, physiology, pathology and radiology to assess patients, develop optimum radiological techniques and evaluate the resulting radiographic media.

This branch of healthcare is extremely varied, especially between different countries, and as a result radiographers in one country often have a completely different role to that of radiographers in another. However, the base responsibilities of the radiographer are summarised below:

- Autonomy as a professional
- Accountability as a professional
- Contribute to and participate in continuing professional development
- Enforcement of radiation protection (There is a duty of care to patients, colleagues and any lay persons that may be irradiated.)
- Justification of radiographic examinations
- Patient care
- Production of diagnostic media
- Safe, efficient and correct use of diagnostic equipment
- Supervise students and assistants

On a basic level, radiographers do not generally interpret diagnostic media, rather they evaluate media and make a decision about its diagnostic effectiveness. In order to make this evaluation radiographers must have a comprehensive but not necessarily exhaustive knowledge of pathology and radiographic appearances; it is for this reason that radiographers often do not interpret or diagnose without further training. Notwithstanding, it is now becoming more common that radiographers have an extended and expanded clinical role, this includes a role in initial radiological diagnosis, diagnosis consultation and what subsequent investigations to conduct. It is not uncommon for radiographers to now conduct procedures which would have previously been undertaken by a cardiologist, urologist, radiologist or oncologist autonomously.

Contrary to what could be inferred, radiographers conduct and contribute to investigations which are not necessarily radiological in nature, e.g. sonography and magnetic resonance imaging.

Radiographers often have opportunities to enter military service due to their role in healthcare. As with most other occupations in the medical field many radiographers have rotating shifts that include night duties.

=== Career pathways ===
Radiography is a deeply diverse profession with many different modalities and specialities. It is not uncommon for radiographers to be specialised in more than one modality and even have expertise of interventional procedures themselves; however this depends on the country in which they operate. As a result of this the typical career pathway for a radiographer is hard to summarise. Upon qualifying it is common for radiographers to focus solely on plain film radiography before specialising in any one chosen modality. After a number of years in the profession, non-imaging based roles often become open and radiographers may then move into these positions.

==== Imaging modalities ====
Generally, imaging modalities are all diagnostic, all have the potential to be used therapeutically in order to deliver an intervention. Modalities (or specialities) include but are not limited to:

Name	Examples of Professional Titles^{1}	Technology^{2}	Ionizing	Description
Angiography/Venography	Angiographer, Angiography Technologist, Angigographic Technologist	Fluoroscopy and/or Image Intensification Radiography mostly with intravascular contrast		Imaging of the cardiovascular system, may be diagnostic or therapeutic in nature. Is utilised under the specialities of Interventional radiology and/or cardiology within a Cath Lab (Catheterisation Laboratory).
Computed Tomography	CT Radiographer, CT Technologist, Neuroradiographer	Computed Tomography (CT) (incl. MDCT/MSCT, EBCT, Sequential CT, etc.)		Provides cross-sectional views (slices) of the body; can also reconstruct additional images from those taken to provide more information in either 2D or pseudo-3D.
Diagnostic Radiography	Diagnostic Radiographer, Radiographer, Radiologic Technologist	Plain Film Radiography (PFD)		Utilises ionising radiation in the examination of internal organs, bones, cavities and foreign objects.
Echocardiography	Sonographer, Ultrasound Radiographer, Ultrasound Technologist, Ultrasonographer	2D, 3D and Doppler Sonography		Utilises 2D, 3D and Doppler Sonography to image the heart.
Fluoroscopy	Fluoroscoper, Fluoroscopy Radiographer, Fluoroscopy Technologist, Fluoroscopic Radiographer, Fluoroscopic Technologist	Fluoroscopy		Utilises continuous and/or pulses of ionising radiation to visualise the various systems of in the body over period of time. Often used in monitoring a bolus or contrast agent in order to highlight vessels and organs, or to position devices within the body (such as pacemakers, guidewires, stents, etc.).
Mammography/Breast Radiography	Mammographer, Mammography Radiographer, Mammography Technologist, Mammographic Radiographer, Mammographic Technologist	Mammographic Plain Film Radiography		Uses low dose ionising radiation systems to produce images for the diagnosis and/or staging of breast disease, primarily breast cancer.
Magnetic Resonance Imaging	MR Radiographer, MR Technologist, Neuroradiographer	Magnetic Resonance Imaging (MRI)		Uses magnetic resonance and radiofrequency pulses for static, dynamic and function imaging.
Nuclear Medicine (NM)/Radionuclide Imaging (RNI)	Nuclear Medicine Radiographer, Nuclear Medicine Technologist, RNI Radiographer, RNI Technologist	Single Photon Emission Computed Tomography (SPECT), Positron Emission Tomography, Positron Emission Tomography Computed Tomography(PET-CT) (all with or without the involvement of Radioactive Tracers)		Uses radioactive tracers which can be administered to examine how the body and organs function. Certain radioisotopes can also be administered to treat certain cancers, such as thyroid cancer.
Sonography/Ultrasonography	Sonographer, Ultrasound Radiographer, Ultrasound Technologist, Ultrasonographer	2D, 3D and Doppler Sonography		Images anatomy and related pathology (such as cancer or cardiopulmonary diseases) using ultrasound waves. Obstetric ultrasonography is the use of ultrasonography to track the course of a pregnancy and detect certain embryonic or fetal malformations or diseases, which may be genetic and/or hereditary in nature. Gynecologic ultrasonography deals with imaging diseases or defects or abnormalities of the female genital and reproductive organs (ovaries, fallopian tubes, vagina, uterus, cervix, clitoris, labia, and breasts).
Surgical/Theatre Radiography	Surgical Radiographer, Surgical Technologist, Theatre Radiographer, Theatre Technologist, Trauma & Orthopaedics (T&O) Radiographer	X-ray image intensifier, varies		Images anatomy and related pathology during surgical procedures.

^{1}Prefixes such as pediatric, geriatric, trauma are routinely placed used in conjunction with professional titles.
^{2}This list of technologies is not exhaustive.

==== Non-imaging modalities ====
Non-imaging modalities vary, and are often undertaken in addition to imaging modalities. They commonly include:

- Academia – Education role.
- Clinical Management – Clinical managerial role which can be varied; may include managing audits, rotas, department budgets, etc.
- Clinical Research – Research role.
- Medical Physics – Multidisciplinary role ensuring the correct calibration of and most efficient use of diagnostic equipment.
- PACS Management – Managerial role concerned with maintaining and supervising appropriate and correct use of the RIS and PACS systems.
- Radiation Protection – A managerial role concerned with monitoring the level of ionising radiation absorbed by anyone who comes into contact with ionising radiation at their site.
- Reporting Radiography – A clinical role involved with interpretation of radiographs and various other radiological media for diagnosis.

== Education and role variation ==
Education varies worldwide due to legal limitations on scope of practice.

=== Belgium ===
The profession of diagnostic radiographer is called "medical imaging technologist", it is a regulated healthcare profession. A diploma of a specific professional Bachelor is a requirement for registration and recognition.

Since 2 December 2014, everyone who works at a Medical Imaging department, is obliged to be in possession of the recognition and the visa issued by the Ministry of Health (a professional identity card that is considered a license)

To practice a health care profession with a foreign diploma from within the EEA or equivalent in the EEA, it is necessary to request the recognition for the profession from Government of Flanders (Agency of Care and Health).

It is possible to request the recognition if:

- The person have a diploma of their healthcare profession and want to practice their profession in Belgium.
- The person have obtained their degree in one of the countries of the European Economic Area (EEA) or Switzerland.
- Or the person's diploma is equivalent in a country of the EEA and they are a European national.

=== Germany ===
In Germany radiographers either take a 3-year full-time professional training or a 5-year part-time professional training before they qualify as a 'Medizinischer Technologe für Radiologie (MTR)' (eng. medical technologist for radiology).

Similar to other countries, they work within the areas of radiography diagnostics (CT scans, magnetic resonance imaging, radiography, digital subtraction angiography), radiation therapy, radiation dosimeters and nuclear medicine.

The job profile is in high demand, with almost half of hospitals struggling to fill MTR positions in 2019. MTR trainees primarily aim for positions in diagnostic and interventional radiology.

=== Ireland ===
Radiographers in the Republic of Ireland (ROI) must be registered with CORU before they can practice in the Republic of Ireland. Student radiographers training in the ROI will typically study for 4 years on an approved bachelor's degree program; currently degree programs only exist at University College Dublin.

Applicants must have either an approved qualification, a schedule 3 qualification, an appropriate letter of recommendation/accreditation or another qualification which is deemed 'suitably relevant' by registration board in order to successfully fulfil the vocational education requirements to become a Radiographer in the ROI. Applications for registration with qualifications outside of this are considered on an individual basis; typically this includes most international applicants.

The professional body representing Radiographers in the ROI is the Irish Institute of Radiography and Radiation Therapy (IIRRT).

To practice as a Radiographer or Radiation Therapist in Ireland, one must register with CORU as of 31 October 2015. CORU is Ireland's multi-profession health regulator. Set up under the Health and Social Care Professionals Act 2005, CORU is used to protect the public by promoting high standards of professional conduct, education, training and competence through statutory registration of health and social care professionals. If a radiographer commences clinical practice without registration then they may be prosecuted with a fine or an imprisonment of up to six months.

=== Malta ===
Radiography is a regulated profession in Malta and anyone wanting to practice Diagnostic or Therapeutic Radiography would need to obtain state registration in order to be licensed as a Radiographer, obtained from the Council for Professions Complementary to Medicine (CPCM).

In Malta, in order for an individual to become a Radiographer he/she first has to follow a course offered by the University of Malta. The course is BSc (Hons) Radiography and its duration is of four years. On completion of the course, the graduate will have the conditions to be eligible for registration with the council for professions complementary to Medicine

A foreign radiographer can work in Malta should the necessary documentation and competencies have been obtained and presented. Radiographers working on Malta should abide by the rules of the host country and title of radiographer will be used.

An application form has to be filled along with the necessary authenticated copies of several documents. The application form includes the insertion of personal details of the individual along with the description of qualifications and the university which granted the qualifications. The individual has to declare whether he or she is registered with another Health Care Profession Register in Malta.

Below is a list of the documents needed for a professional to register with the council:

- Application Form
- Original or authenticated copies of the following documents (English versions): a. Birth and marriage (if applicable) certificates.
- Identification document such as ID or Passport.
- Recent Police Conduct certificate.
- Professional Document Diploma/Degree.
- Letters of Reference in English.
- A detailed transcript of Theoretical and Practical Training and Studies in hours associated with the Profession and in relation with the profession syllabus performed by their Institution being the university/College. This has to be endorsed in the original format by the Head/Registrar of their Institution being the university/College.
- A recent (six months) verification certificate of current registration and good standing with the council the person are registered with.
- A secure English Language test (SELT) for foreign applicants.
- Curriculum Vitae in English.

In cases where the professional qualification acquired was not obtained from an Accredited Institution in Malta, a letter is to be submitted, issued from the Malta Qualifications Recognition Information Centre (MQRIC), certifying that the Institution from where the qualification was obtained is equivalently accredited and indicate the level of qualification in accordance to the Malta Qualifications Framework.

For applicants from the European Economic Area countries, once the application is submitted, it will follow the regulations established on the Directive 2005/36/EC on the recognition of qualifications between member states. In these cases, the professional document and theoretical and practical training are required to be equivalent to the requirements of Malta, i.e. An EQF Level 6 Bachelor's Degree with an equivalent syllabus to that of the University of Malta and their course is no more than one year shorter. Should the radiographer have a substantial difference between their professional qualifications and those required by CPCM, the radiographer has the right to provide further evidence of competence (including professional experience or CPD), otherwise, the CPCM board should offer the applicant the possibility to do an aptitude test or adaptation period (as chosen by the applicant). A Flow chart explaining this procedure for EEA applicants can be found on the government's website.

=== Nepal ===
As a developing country, the health care sector in Federal Democratic Republic of Nepal has very limited resources meaning radiological services are rather limited. Nepal is still struggling to improve and manage conventional radiological examinations. Radiological Services in Nepal commenced in 1923 at Military Hospital by Dr. Rana and Dr Asta Bahadur Shrestha. The first health related training program began in 1933 at the Nepal Rajkiya Ayurved School; the Civil Medical School was later established in 1934. Radiological education in Nepal started in 1923 in a 64 bedded Military Hospital, Tri-ChandraElectro-Medical Institute. The post graduate (MSc) program in physics at TU began in 1965 with only Nuclear Physics specialization. In 1972, the Institute of Medicine (IOM) which is affiliated with TU started the Proficiency Certificate Level (PCL) Radiography course however this has since stopped.

Radiotherapy was first introduced at Maternity Hospital in 1976 utilising radium needle treatment. CT and Nuclear Medicine was introduced in 1988 at Bir Hospital. The Radiotherapy unit with Tele Cobalt-60 machine was established at Bir Hospital in 1991.

Nepal became a member of IAEA in 2008. Since 2008 onwards diploma level radiography courses have been conducted across the country by the Council for Technical Education and Vocational Training (CTEVT) and other affiliated institutions.

In Nepal there are 125 vocational health training institutes however only 15 are conducting radiological technological education. Bachelor level radiography education is taught in two universities & one college whereas master level radiography course is taught in one where another university is in pipeline. Until recently, therapeutic radiography courses have not been taught in Nepal; radiation therapists are predominantly trained abroad.

The Nepal Health Professional Council (NHPC) is the legislative body for registering, accrediting, developing & enforcing quality assurance of Health Professionals, including Radiographers, in Nepal.

=== The Netherlands ===
==== The Quality Register Paramedics ====
Until 1997, radiographers were required to register the Evidence of Competence at the Chief of Medical Inspections. This was mandatory under the Law on Paramedic professions. After innovate the law of Individual Health Care Professions (BIG), the registration requirements for radiographers were cancelled. A voluntary register has been set up in consultation with the Health Care Inspectorate: the Paramedics Quality Register.

The Paramedics Quality Register comes from the BIG. The purpose of the Paramedics Quality Register is to guarantee the quality of professional practice. Through the registration and re-registration (once in five years) it becomes visible for patients, health insurers etc. that the registered radiographer professional is and remains competent in the field of professional practice. Despite the fact that the quality register is not compulsory according to the law, many hospitals are obliged to do it. The hospitals are obliged to provide good quality care. Health insurers also attach great value to the Paramedics Quality Register because they are also required to provide good care.

==== Enrollment ====
Radiographers who are in possession of a valid Certificate of Competence, diploma of certificate and endorse the code of professional conduct of the professional association, can be enroll in the Paramedics historical register.

The official registration of the radiographer satisfies the educational requirements in the General Administrative Order (AMvB) ex. art. 34 BIG and the quality requirements of the professional group. On the basis of which is carried out radiographer is mentioned in the Diplomaregister Paramedici and / or the Quality Register Paramedics. By registration, the radiographer continues to be traced by, for example, the Health Care Inspectorate (IGZ) and the professional associations. Other organizations also intend the Quality Register Paramedics.

==== Re-enrollment ====
To be in the Paramedics Quality Register the radiographer need to request re-registration every five years. The first period of five years is determined on the basis of the diploma date. In case of re-registration, the radiographer must meet the requirements for that period. The start date of the period station local quality criteria. The quality criteria are set every five years by the Paramedics Quality Register, paramedical professional associations. To ensure that the requirements for the patient and the client-oriented exercises and expertise-enhancing activities are safeguarded for the quality of the professional practice. The quality criteria are set up in such a way that paramedics can meet the quality requirements with the set range of expertise-enhancing activities.

=== Nigeria ===
In Nigeria, these professionals are generally referred to as Radiographers or Medical Radiographers to differentiate them from Industrial Radiographers. Radiographers must complete a 5-year undergraduate BSc and a compulsory one year paid internship program in a hospital after graduation before attaining a full licensing by the Radiographers Registration Board of Nigeria. The board also registers Radiotherapists who have undergone the initial 5-year Radiography program before proceeding to the Radiotherapy training.

Radiographers in Nigeria have been striving to extend their practice to include radiographic interpretation and Ultrasound services. They are also on the verge of adopting an official professional title of "Radr" or "Rr" As of 2015. Radiographers in Nigeria normally proceed for a Masters programme and a PhD programme in the profession. There is a recent rise in the number of radiographers available in the country unlike the situation of shortage between 2000 – 2010.

In a typical Nigerian Teaching Hospital, radiographers do not undertake sonography examinations, this is left for the radiologists, who, in some areas, have gradually improved their relationship with the radiographers in providing services in other radiographic units. The radiologist is also in charge of specific Fluoroscopic cases where the radiographer assists only with positioning and image acquisition.

Allied Health Unions (such as 'JOHESU' and 'NUAHP') that Radiographers are members of (with Nurses, Pharmacists, Physiotherapists, Laboratory Scientists, etc.), have over the years gone on strike actions to force the Nigerian government to improve their allowances/salaries in the government owned hospitals. These strikes (when it is not a response on its own) often trigger a response from the Nigerian Medical Association who will also table some requests for the medical doctors.

Apart from monetary issues, these professional bodies are also in loggerheads over non-doctors requesting to be given top administrative roles in government owned hospitals. Many radiographers, however, do not particularly involve themselves in these movements as working in a private establishment is more lucrative.

Some Radiographers in Nigeria are also keen on setting up a "Department of Radiography" in the government owned hospitals which will not be under the Head of the Radiology Department. Some hospitals however have an understanding between the Radiology head (a Radiologist) and the Chief Radiographer where all radiographers are directly answerable to their Chief, and not the HOD.

=== Saudi Arabia ===
X-Ray Technicians (فني اشعة) in Saudi Arabia must successfully undertake a degree level program at a recognised higher-level education institution in Nursing before undertaking further study in radiographic imaging at university for typically 2 to 3 years; this must include a year's experience in a hospital. Upon completion, graduates are qualified X-Ray Technicians and can commence clinical practice.

=== United Kingdom ===
The SCoR is the professional body and union for UK radiographers. In the United Kingdom, there is ambiguity in the use of the term Radiographer as this does not differentiate between Therapeutic Radiographers (also known as Radiotherapists) and Diagnostic Radiographers. As a result, all of these titles are protected titles within the United Kingdom and can not be used by any persons who has not undertaken formal study and registered with the Health and Care Professions Council (HCPC). In order to practise Radiography in the United Kingdom candidates must now successfully obtain a pass in a degree level programme from an accredited institution. Degrees are offered by universities across the UK and last for at least 3 years in England, Wales and Northern Ireland; and 4 years in Scotland. Student Diagnostic Radiographers spend a significant amount of time working at various hospitals affiliated with their university during their studies to meet the requirement for registration with the HCPC.

They specialise in the acquisition of radiographs of General Practitioner referred (GP) patients, Outpatients, Emergency Department (ED) referred patients and Inpatients. They conduct mobile X-rays on wards and in other departments where patients are too critical to be moved and work as part of the operating team in mainly Orthopaedic and Urology cases, offering surgeons live radiographic imaging. Once qualified, Diagnostic Radiographers are able to acquire X-rays without supervision and work as part of the imaging team. They will have basic head examination qualifications in CT and even basic experience of MRI, Ultrasound and Nuclear Medicine.

Diagnostic Radiographers can specialise in-house or through a university course as a postgraduate in CT, MRI, Ultrasound or Nuclear Medicine with opportunities to gain an MSc or PhD in their field. Diagnostic Radiographers in the UK are also taking on roles that were typically only undertaken by the Radiologist (a medical doctor who specialised in interpreting X-rays), Urologist or Cardiologist in the past. This extended practice includes various interventional procedures not excluding barium enemas, barium meals/swallows, peripheral angioplasties, nerve root injections, central line insertions and many other procedures.

The professional body and workers union for Radiographers in the United Kingdom is the Society and College of Radiographers (SCoR). The union has been heavily involved in extending practice of Radiographers in the United Kingdom and has helped expand the role of the Radiographer greatly.

==== Expanded practice ====
Radiographers are now able to write reports and diagnose pathologies and/or conditions seen on differing diagnostic media after completing a HCPC and SCoR accredited university course; completing a course in this modality allows the Radiographer to become a reporting Radiographer in their chosen specialty.

Diagnostic Radiographers are able to become supplementary prescribers which allows them the capacity to prescribe medications in partnership with an independent prescriber (a doctor or a dentist); the supplementary prescriber is to implement an agreed Clinical Management Plan for an individual patient with that patient's agreement. An accredited university course must be undertaken before this role extension is annotated onto a HCPC registrant's record. It is thought that in the future Diagnostic Radiographers in will gain independent prescribing rights, however this is currently limited by their restricted and varied scope of practice. In 2016, the introduction of independent prescribing right was agreed for Therapeutic Radiographers after a consultation by the Medicines and Healthcare products Regulatory Agency (MHRA)

=== United States ===
In the United States, these professionals are known as Radiologic Technologists. Formal training programs in radiography range in length that leads to a certificate, an associate or a bachelor's degree. The American Registry of Radiologic Technologists (ARRT), the primary credentialing organisation for Radiologic Technologists in the United States, requires that candidates for ARRT Certification Exams must have an associate degree at minimum as of January, 2015, effectively ending non-degree granting diploma programs. Accreditation is primarily through The Joint Review Committee on Education in Radiologic Technology (JRCERT), the only agency recognised by the United States Department of Education and the Council for Higher Education Accreditation to grant accreditation to both traditional and online programs in Radiography, Radiation Therapy, Magnetic Resonance Imaging, and Medical Dosimetry. An online page where prospective students can check the accreditation of programs is maintained by JRCERT.

Radiologic Technology students study anatomy, physiology, physics, radiopharmacology, pathology, biology, research, nursing, medical imaging, diagnosis, radiologic instrumentation, emergency medical procedures, medical imaging techniques, patient care, medical ethics and general chemistry. Schooling also includes significant amounts of documented practicum supervised by Registered Technologists in various clinical settings where the classroom theory is translated to practical knowledge and real world experience. The change from Film to Digital imaging has changed training as film quality assurance and quality control is largely obsolete. The role of computer workstations to produce synthetic images for Radiologists has steadily increased the need for computer skills as has electronic medical record software.

After primary training and licensure, continuing education is required to maintain licensure and certification with the ARRT, who sets the accepted national guidelines. The ARRT requires 24 Units of accredited continuing education every two years and the laws and the regulations of most states accept this standard. Continuing formal education or the passing of an advanced practice speciality exam may also be accepted for continuing education credit. The American Society of Radiologic Technologists (ASRT), a professional association for people in Medical Imaging and Therapy, offers members and others continuing education materials in various media that meet the requirements of the ARRT for continuing education. Additional requirements are set forth for technologists who specialise in mammography by the US FDA.

==== Expanded practice ====
An expanded career for Radiologic Technologists is that of the Registered Radiologist Assistant (RRA) who is an technologist (a type of Physician Assistant) who has completed additional education, training, and has passed exams to function as radiologist extenders. A list of the 9 currently accredited RRA programs is maintained by the ARRT and can be accessed online. Candidates for the RRA certification must possess a bachelor's degree at minimum.

Registered Radiologist Assistant (RRA), a new advanced practice radiographer career path in the United States for experienced technologists. RRAs do not interpret studies in the manner of the reporting radiographer. The role has been accepted by the American College of Radiology (ACR).

== Risks ==
- Epidemiological studies indicate that Radiographers employed before 1950 are at increased risk of leukemia and skin cancer, most likely due to the lack of use of radiation monitoring and shielding. The relationship between radiation and cancer was found to correlate with women who were in the menopausal stages of their lives. In today's workplace, radiation exposure is monitored very closely and cancer cases in technologists has been found to have decreased tremendously due to the current prevention methods.
- Ionising radiation, used in a variety of imaging procedures, can damage cells. Lead shields are used on the patient and by the Radiographer to reduce exposure by shielding areas that do not need to be imaged from the radiation source. While lead is highly toxic, the shields used in medical imaging are coated to prevent lead exposure and are regularly tested for integrity.
- Radiographers who develop x-ray films are exposed to the various chemical hazards such as sulfur dioxide, glutaraldehyde, and acetic acid. These agents can cause asthma and other health issues.
- Theoretically, the strong static magnetic fields of MRI scanners can cause physiological changes. After a human neural cell culture was exposed to a static magnetic field for 15 minutes, changes in cell morphology occurred along with some modifications in the physiological functions of those cells. However, these effects have not yet been independently replicated or confirmed, and this particular study was performed in vitro.
- Ultrasound imaging can deform cells in the imaging field, if those cells are in a fluid. However, this effect is not sufficient to damage the cells.
- As with any allied health professional, exposure to infectious diseases is likely, and use of Personal Protective Equipment (PPE) and infection control precautions must be employed to reduce the risk of infection. Those with family health histories reported feeling increased amount of stress due to concern of bringing infectious diseases home.
- In 2016, 59% of technologists surveyed reported that being overworked lead to risking medical error and threatening patient safety. Being overworked also led to depersonalization due to the emotional drain it takes on technologists' mental health, also putting patients at risk.
- Due to constantly maneuvering heavy patients, technologists are at risk for work related injuries from the strain it puts on their bodies. Most technologists who develop a work related injury, later report having more work related injuries.
