= Healthcare technician =

A healthcare technician (HCT), also known as a patient care technician (PCT) or certified nursing assistant (CNA), is a health professional that provides care to patients. The primary task of a HCT is to assist medical staff complete tasks around their assigned unit or clinic and accommodate patient needs. HCTs are typically found in specialty clinics, intensive care units, emergency departments, or laboratory collection facilities. HCTs will perform basic cardiology reports such as electrocardiograms and will have a basic understanding of bodily functions. The technician is an integral member of the unit-based healthcare team, and they contribute to the continuity of care by decreasing fragmentation through decentralization of selected diagnostic and therapeutic treatment modalities.

== Role description ==
Healthcare technicians provide two levels of care: direct and indirect. Often, they are trained and qualified to complete specialty tasks, depending on clinic needs. HCTs play a key role in patient care and cleanliness of hospital units. Their objectives include basic nursing care, use of communication skills to assist patients in adapting to common health problems, provide continuity of care, demonstrate acceptance of responsibility for learning purposes, and proper demonstration for accountability purposes. HCTs can assist the medical team while evaluating patients on a routine basis within primary care clinics. They can be trained to perform emotional health surveys to evaluate the standing of patients' mental health. This screening measure performed by HCTs can help create awareness and assist in the diagnosis and prevention of patient depression.

=== Direct care ===
Qualified members performing direct patient care may work directly with patients and assist with their care and well-being. This type of care usually involves the following duties:

- Specimen collection (blood or bodily fluids)
- Venipuncture procedures or IV insertion
- Dressing changes
- Electrocardiograms
- Obtaining vital signs
- Patient monitoring (including direct observation of psychiatric patients)
- Oral suctioning
- Assisting patients with bathing and grooming
- Therapeutic maneuvering and repositioning of patients
- Transport of patients for medical procedure

According to a recent article, the following tasks met as the highest job priority for healthcare technicians: Blood draws, arterial gases, venous access through IV insertion, central line dressing changes, electrocardiograms, patient monitoring, oxygen requirements, breathing exercises, and vital signs. HCT's are at the forefront of healthcare and can assist in the addressing issues or concerns within the healthcare structure. They can be utilized to mention gaps or strengths when addressing chronic pain patients within the healthcare system. The empathetic approach that HCT's use while on the job can assist medical teams better care for patients facing chronic health illnesses.

=== Indirect care ===
Aside from routine patient care, healthcare technicians will complete many duties outside of direct care. The indirect care performed by healthcare technicians will ensure continuity of care. Technicians will maintain clinic or units with:

- Unit cleanliness
- Stocking of medical instruments
- Supply procurement
- Clerical duties
- Transportation of patient belongings

=== Specialty duties ===
Although healthcare technicians perform several direct and indirect tasks, they also perform specialty duties. These duties are delegated to ensure clinic specific needs are met. These duties include:

- Cleaning of duty specific equipment
- Use of atypical equipment
- Completion of qualification to provide specific care
- Knowledge based studies to enhance the work environment

=== Education requirements ===
Most allied health programs are of associate degree levels or state issued certification. A potential student will need to complete a certified program and a clinical externship. The duration of most programs is 10–24 weeks and vary with credit load. Medical technician students will complete the following courses:

- Anatomy/Physiology I & II
- Clinical Competencies I & II
- Medical Coding & other various administrative courses
- Pharmacology
- Medical Terminology

=== Job field ===
Upon graduation and certification qualification, health technologist will be gainfully employed by:

- Hospitals, physicians' offices, and specialty clinics.

According to the United States Department of Labor, medical assistants (HCT, CMA, MA) held approximately 560,800 jobs in 2012 with a median pay of $29,370 per year. Also, the Bureau of Labor Statistics has projected a 29% employment growth from 2012–2022.

There is a growing need for a cohort of competent technicians to support the range of occupational health service delivery and to release nurses from some of the more routine tasks of their day-to-day work.

== Daily tasks ==
Most duties performed while working are distributed by several technicians. Although many tasks are at times stressful, one must complete these jobs effortlessly and without error. The most difficult task while working is successfully being able to manage multiple units (or offices) and be efficient. Throughout an 8-hour day a tech may be assigned to 1–4 different areas and have to have direct or indirect care with patients. Duties will often include lifting, prolonged standing, blood-draw, and patient bathing needs. Each job performed will have annual competencies completed to ensure patient safety standards are compliant.

=== Levels of priority ===
Each technician is trained with levels of priority. This can be described as the time frame at which one completes certain tasks or duties. For example: a technician will be given blood cultures (a lab specimen collected to verify the growth of bacterium in the blood system.), routine lab collections, glucose testing, and equipment processing (cleaning of medical equipment). Depending on staffing levels a technician will have to determine which task will need completed first per priority level. This will be established by the technician based upon patient needs or volume of patients needing testing, staffing levels, and the efficiency level at which they can complete the most work.
