= Clinical collaboration =

Clinical collaboration is the collaboration of organizations, teams of professionals, or small groups of individual professionals, each having skills, equipment or information that will complement what their partner has, all seeking to be more effective. Choosing one's partner is important, and has been described as "similar to the accreditation process of Joint Commission on the Accreditation of Healthcare Organizations." "CHOP Hub For Clinical Collaboration Arrives on the Skyline in University City, West Philadelphia" was a 2020 headline describing a coming 19-story medical building.

While clinical collaboration, which has been described as a "culture" rather than as something to be purchased, is not a "full-asset merger," a clinical collaboration does aid the financial goal of "to maximize the value of" a franchise. It also gives more eyes to aid in reducing risk.

== Overview ==
Clinical collaboration is not "one size fits all", and its areas of potential effectiveness include medical/pharmaceutical research, healthcare/doctors and nurses, emergency room care, and ambulatory and ambulance services. One potential obstacle they all face is anti-trust law, but proof of concept exists: partnership contract renewals.

Other concepts affecting healthcare delivery are "clinical affiliation" and "non-clinical collaboration."

== Medical research ==
Cancer research is an example where clinical collaboration can advance state of the art.

=== Pharmaceutical research ===
Major pharmaceutical companies such as Pfizer and Bristol-Myers Squibb have arranged clinical collaborations with companies such as NeoImmuneTech, Checkmate Pharmaceuticals and Kitov for testing and evaluating the effectiveness of combinations of existing medicines. If the tested combination attains regulatory approval, "it opens up new patient populations for each company’s drug."

== Healthcare ==
Clinical collaboration between facilities permits sharing the availability of specialists and high tech equipment, often involving specialized communication links to facilitate data sharing.

Issues that must be prearranged include patient data privacy and security, including HIPAA compliance. Some of this is software apps that go beyond standard data sharing using more "aware" software.

Rural areas need it to provide service, and small healthcare providers in large areas need it to survive. In these seemingly asymmetrical arrangements, there is an avoidable potential for domination for which due diligence and preplanning and proper preparation is needed.

=== Doctors and nurses ===
Clinical collaboration, properly implemented, must be seamless to be most effective. This includes overlapping staffing and concurrent shifts of doctors with varying specialties and focus, along with nurses and paramedics. The goal is not new, and the situation has improved with use of technology that enables going beyond paper-based records.

== Contrast to affiliation ==
Even though there may be financial benefits to the arrangement, it contrasts with financial affiliation, where profit is the driving motive. An example is where a research project is incurring major expenditures with cost writeoffs: "cost-sharing clinical collaboration" enables "building value" that goes beyond making money to "encouraging activity" that is high risk but, if successful in the long run, will save lives. The medical director of the Mayo Clinic Care Network referred to "due diligence" in an article about Clinical Collaboration as an alternative to health care mergers and acquisitions.

A well implemented medical facility clinical affiliation agreement "maintains each hospital’s independence in governance, budgeting, labor agreements and will not move or remove any local services."
