= Medical radiation scientist =

Medical Radiation Scientists (MRS) (also referred to as Radiologic Technologists) are healthcare professionals who perform complex diagnostic imaging studies on patients or plan and administer radiation treatments to cancer patients. Medical radiation scientists include diagnostic radiographers, nuclear medicine radiographers, magnetic resonance radiographers, medical/cardiac sonographers, and radiation therapists. Most medical radiation scientists work in imaging clinics and hospitals' imaging departments with the exception of Radiation Therapists, who work in specialised cancer centers and clinics.

== Educational requirements ==
A Medical Radiation Scientist must graduate from an accredited Bachelor of Medical Radiation Science or Bachelor of Applied Science in Medical Radiation Science program in order to register and practise in Australia. Even though there are bachelor's programs in Medical and Cardiac ultrasound but these are often offered at the graduate level as a certificate, postgraduate diploma, or master's degree for the Bachelor of Medical Radiation Science graduates.

Graduates from the medical radiation sciences possess a good understanding of nuclear physics, quantum physics, radiation physics, wave physics, medical terminologies, pathology, oncology, radiobiology, mathematics, anatomy and physiology, and are highly skilled in the operation of complex electronic equipments, computers, and precision instruments which often cost millions of dollars.

=== Diagnostic radiographers ===
Radiographers produce diagnostic images with various types of radiation, including x-rays, whilst ensuring the patient is safely exposed to radiation.

=== Nuclear medicine radiographers ===
Nuclear Medicine Radiographers use gamma rays produced from short-lived radioisotopes that emit radioactive tracers to investigate trauma and disease such as cancer, heart disease and brain disorders.

=== Magnetic resonance radiographers ===
Magnetic resonance radiographers produce diagnostic images with magnetic resonance imagers.

=== Ultrasonographers ===
Ultrasonographers (medical and cardiac) produce diagnostic images through the use of ultrasound units.

=== Radiation therapist ===
Radiation therapists plan and administer optimal treatments to cancer patients.
