= Cardiovascular technologist =

Health professional for circulatory system

A cardiovascular technician, also known as a vascular technician, is health professional that deal with the circulatory system.

== Cardiac sonographer ==
Technologists who use ultrasound to examine the heart chambers, valves, and vessels are referred to as cardiac sonographers. They use ultrasound instrumentation to create images called echocardiograms. An echocardiogram may be performed while the patient is either resting or physically active. Sonographers may administer medication to physically active patients to assess their heart function. Cardiac sonographers also may assist transesophageal echocardiography, which involves placing a tube in the patient's esophagus to obtain ultrasound images.

== Vascular Technologist ==
Those who assist in the diagnosis of disorders affecting the circulation are known as vascular technologist, vascular specialists or vascular sonographers. They obtain a medical history, evaluate pulses and assess blood flow in arteries and veins by listening to the vascular flow sounds for abnormalities. Then they perform a noninvasive procedure using ultrasound instrumentation to record vascular information such as vascular blood flow, blood pressure, changes in limb volume, oxygen saturation, cerebral circulation, peripheral circulation, and abdominal circulation. Many of these tests are performed during or immediately after surgery.

== EKG technician ==
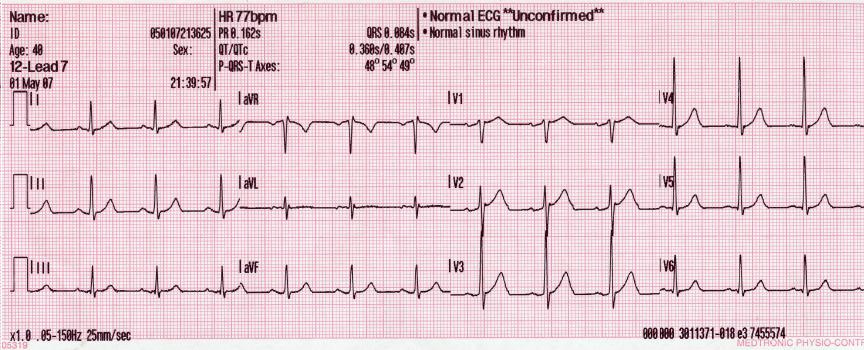
An electrocardiogram technician can have many roles in the hospital, based around the recording of electrocardiograms, as depicted here

Cardiovascular technicians who obtain EKGs are known as electrocardiograph (or EKG) technicians. To take a basic EKG, which traces electrical impulses transmitted by the heart, technicians attach electrodes to the patient's chest, arms, and legs, and then manipulate switches on an EKG machine to obtain a reading. An EKG is printed out for interpretation by the physician. This test is done before most kinds of surgery or as part of a routine physical examination, especially on persons who have reached middle age or who have a history of cardiovascular problems.

EKG technicians with advanced training setup Holter monitor and stress testing. For Holter monitoring, technicians place electrodes on the patient's chest and attach a portable EKG monitor to the patient's belt. Following 24 or more hours of normal activity by the patient, the technician removes a tape from the monitor and places it in a scanner. After checking the quality of the recorded impulses on an electronic screen, the technician usually prints the information from the tape for analysis by a physician. Physicians use the output from the scanner to diagnose heart ailments, such as heart rhythm abnormalities or problems with pacemakers.

For a treadmill stress test, EKG technicians document the patient's medical history, explain the procedure, connect the patient to an EKG monitor, and obtain a baseline reading and resting blood pressure. Next, they monitor the heart's performance while the patient is walking on a treadmill, gradually increasing the treadmill's speed to observe the effect of increased exertion.

The position is generally unlicensed and skills are learned on the job; however, two- and four-year training programs to learn advanced ECG technical skills are available at junior colleges and community colleges.
