= OpenNotes =

American healthcare research initiative

- Headquarters: Beth Israel Deaconess Medical Center

OpenNotes is a research initiative and international movement located at Beth Israel Deaconess Medical Center (affiliated with Harvard Medical School).

== OpenNotes (the organization) ==
OpenNotes is a research initiative and international movement located at Beth Israel Deaconess Medical Center (affiliated with Harvard Medical School), that focuses on making health care more open and transparent by encouraging doctors, nurses, therapists, and other health care professionals to share clinical visit notes (SOAP note) with patients, facilitating patients' legal right to access to their own medical record. Patients who have access to their full medical record, including their notes, report having a better understanding their diagnosed conditions, feeling more in control of healthcare decisions, and being able to identify errors and inaccuracies in their medical records.

=== Early funding for OpenNotes ===
The research and dissemination work of the OpenNotes organization is funded entirely by grants, foundations, and philanthropy. In 2015, four major healthcare philanthropic organizations (Robert Wood Johnson Foundation, Cambia Health Foundation, Gordon and Betty Moore Foundation, Peterson Center on Healthcare) pledged $10 million in funding to spread access to clinical notes to 50 million people in the U.S. In 2017, the New York State Health Foundation funded eight hospitals to foster the spread of open notes, and later funded six non-hospital organizations to spread open notes at community centers. Specific research investigating patient partnerships to discover and report errors in medical records has been funded by the Agency for Healthcare Research Quality (AHRQ) and the Society to Improve Diagnosis in Medicine (SIDM).

=== Scholarship ===
OpenNotes is a research component of the Research Section of the Division of General Medicine at Beth Israel Deaconess Medical Center in Boston, MA. The program is affiliated with the John F. Keane & Family Professorship in Medicine at Harvard Medical School; the holder of this title is recognized as a distinguished as a leader in advancing patient and clinician engagement and health care transparency.

== Open notes (the concept) ==
In medicine and health care, clinical notes are detailed documentation about a medical professional's encounter with a patient (also known as the SOAP note). Notes become part of a person's medical record within a given institution. Notes are written by the treating medical provider, but could also be drafted by a medical scribe or medical student and later signed by a board-certified physician.

U.S. citizens have the legal right to request and receive copies of their medical records, including clinical notes, through the Health Insurance Portability and Accountability Act of 1996 (HIPAA). The process of making a formal medical records request through a hospital can take time and effort, and people must pay for the materials the medical records are delivered on (e.g., paper copies, CDs and DVDs).

An "open note" is when doctors, nurses other medical professionals share clinical visit notes with patients. Sharing clinical notes with patients was made easier after the widespread adoption of electronic health records in the United States and around the world.

As of April 5, 2021, U.S. patients were granted near immediate access to most all information in their electronic medical records, including progress notes; when notes are shared with patients, they become "open notes." (See: OpenNotes: Related U.S. Public Policy.)

== Research about open visit notes ("open notes") ==
=== Original open notes demonstration project ===
In 2010, Beth Israel Deaconess Medical Center in Boston, Geisinger Health System in Pennsylvania, and Seattle's Harborview Medical Center launched an exploratory study involving 105 primary care doctors inviting 20,000 of their patients to read their clinical notes via secure online patient portals. The study, funded by the Robert Wood Johnson Foundation, examined the effects of sharing notes on both patients and doctors. Results of this study were published in the Annals of Internal Medicine in 2012 in the paper, "Inviting Patients to Read Their Doctors' Notes: A Quasi-Experimental Study and a Look Ahead." The paper showed that doctors reported little change in workload and clinician fears were unfounded. Patients overwhelmingly approved of note sharing as a practice; few were worried or confused by their notes. Instead, patients reported that reading notes helped them feel more in control of their health and health care.

In response, several health systems made plans to adopt open notes. This study has been replicated at numerous sites in the U.S., including at Kaiser Permanente Northwest, Cedars-Sinai, and at the U.S. Department of Veterans' Affairs, and led to the adoption of sharing clinical notes in North America.

=== Primary care ===
Research indicates 25% of patients who contact doctors as a result of reading their notes report possible errors. In a 2012 study, up to 78% of patients reported that reading doctor's notes helped them take their medications as prescribed. A study by the Geisinger Center for Health Research found patients offered access to notes were more likely to fill their prescriptions for blood pressure medication. A majority of patients reported that reviewing notes made them feel the same or better about their doctor. Research shows that sharing notes with patients can lead to improved communication, collaborative decision-making, and strengthened relationships. 77–87% of patients in one study said that accessing their notes made them feel more in control of their health care.

=== Caregivers / care partners ===
In a study, caregivers reported benefits from note sharing similar to those reported by patients. When caregivers are able to review notes (e.g., through a healthcare proxy) they report being able to better manage the health needs of people in their care, including scheduling visits, reconciling medication lists, and following through on recommendations.

=== Pediatrics and adolescents ===
Starting at age 13, Boston Children's Hospital offers parents and patients separate portal accounts so that adolescent children are able to access their open notes. A small study (N=55) of adolescents and young adults (ages 12–20) with chronic pediatric gastrointestinal/liver disease show that in general, AYA's are satisfied with their clinical notes, and all but 1 of the study participants had adequate functional health literacy.

=== Vulnerable populations ===
Lower income patients, African Americans and other racial minorities, and those with less than high school education are more likely than white patients or those with higher incomes to report improved trust in their clinician and health care organization when access to notes is offered. When patients read notes, they report benefits, including feeling more comfortable with and in control of medications, having an increased understanding of side effects, and being more likely to take medications as prescribed.

=== Mental health ===
Using notes as an integral component of therapy is gaining interest among mental health professionals and patients. Mental health notes are usually written by psychologists, psychiatrists, and social workers. A report from a small sample of Veterans Health Administration patients reading online mental health notes indicates patient experiences are more positive than negative when reading mental health notes. In a study of psychotherapists' notes shared with patients online at Beth Israel Deaconess Medical Center, results showed, "Nearly all survey respondents (94%) agreed that having open therapy notes is a good idea, and 87% wanted it to continue. More than half reported therapy notes were 'very important'... for feeling in control of their care, trusting their providers and taking care of themselves. Two respondents felt offended, and 7 (11%) felt judged by something they read in a note."

Not as many health organizations have chosen to share mental notes due to concerns patients could become confused, anxious, or offended by what is written. Some have suggested this is a philosophical dilemma that could be addressed by reconsidering assumptions that reading notes is harmful, and instead conceiving the therapy notes as an extension of the clinical encounter.

=== Oncology ===
Common concerns clinicians have about sharing oncology notes include: patients receiving "bad news" about their diagnosis before talking with a doctor (e.g., through access to test results, radiology reports); oncologists writing more in a note about prognosis than what they may say to a patient during an in-person visit; and that patients will become anxious as a result of reading the note.

A study published in Cancer Cell in 2020 outlined how cancer patient and oncology clinician views of open notes differed. Example from the article: 98% of cancer patients believed open notes to be a "good idea," while 70% of oncology clinicians felt the same. Another gap: while 44% of clinicians believed cancer patients would be confused by their notes, just 4% of the cancer patients reported feeling confused.

MD Anderson Cancer Center began sharing clinical notes through their online patient portal in 2009, and report that oncology patients experience similar benefits to reading their notes as primary care patients.

"… our active patients have obtained access to their electronic records. As a result, they are more informed about their care plan and diagnostic results and ask smarter, more focused questions. There have been no adverse consequences and generally positive feedback from patients and physicians." - Feeley TW, Shine KI. Access to the Medical Record for Patients and Involved Providers: Transparency Through Electronic Tools. Ann Intern Med. 2011;155:853–854. doi: 10.7326/0003-4819-155-12-201112200-00010

Harborview Medical Center began sharing clinic visit notes in most all outpatient settings in 2014, including in outpatient oncology. In an editorial for the Journal of Oncology Practice, Daniel B. Martin, MD, said, "The clinic visit note will become another tool with which providers communicate with patients… providing all the information a patient can choose to use in an accessible format facilitates better communication between patients and their providers."

In 2017, UCLA and Memorial Sloan Kettering wanted to better understand patient perceptions of open access to radiation oncology notes made available through the online patient portal. The study found all patients reported the notes to be useful; 94-96% of patients self-reported as having an improved understanding of their diagnosis, of treatment side effects, and feeling more reassured about treatment. However, 4-11% of patients noted increased worry and confusion, or now having found information they "regret reading."

In 2018, a qualitative study was conducted of patients in treatment for metastatic or advanced cancer who read their clinical notes at Duke Health. Interviews with these patients revealed most thought reading notes improved their care experiences, although a small subset experienced increased distress.

Qualitative research of oncology open notes in Sweden challenged assumptions about how and when patients receive information about their cancer care. As part of the study, one patient said, "if we can manage to have all of these cancer diseases and to live with it, then we can handle reading about it." In a survey of oncologists in Sweden, "73% believed that patient access to oncology notes was a good idea" and perceived "patients felt they had more control of their care."

=== Accuracy of the record, quality and safety ===
When solicited through an online reporting tool, one-quarter of patients and families receiving care at three different health systems sharing clinical notes in the United States identified potential medical documentation errors, half of which were considered "important" by the patients/families and clinicians. The most common potential inaccuracies included how symptoms were described, past medical history, and the list of medications patients were taking.

A survey of 22,889 note-reading patients at 3 U.S. health systems showed that 1 in 5 patients surveyed claimed they could find errors in their visit notes; the most commonly reported errors had to do with diagnoses, history and medications. More than 40% of those who reported finding an error said the error was 'serious.'

=== Clinician reception to open notes ===
Clinicians (e.g., doctors, nurses) who are considering sharing notes have reported anxiety about sharing notes with patients, including concerns about an increase in workflow, time spent in documentation, and litigation risks (see: medical malpractice and physician burnout). Clinicians who share notes report workflows are not significantly changed, and a majority acknowledge that sharing notes is a good idea. More than half of doctors participating in a study felt sharing notes led to improved patient satisfaction and trust.

In 2020, a survey of 1,628 clinicians (including physicians, specialist physicians, advanced practice nurses, physician assistants, therapists and others) who have been sharing clinical notes with patients for a year or more was published in JAMA Network Open. The study showed that 74% held positive views about note sharing, and most found the practice did not affect their workflow and would recommend it to colleagues at other institutions.

==== Changes to documentation when patients are reading ====
A study published in the Journal of Clinical Oncology Cancer Clinical Informatics analyzed 102,135 clinical notes written by 35 hematologists/oncologists at the Beth Israel Deaconess Medical Center before and after open notes. On average, clinicians did not change their note documentation, but for some there were significant changes: roughly equal proportions of clinicians make language simpler and more complex; clinicians who were previously late to submit their note documentation began completing and signing their notes more quickly. A mixed methods study of 13 interviews and a random effects modeling of >500 clinical notes revealed no significant changes in oncology documentation pre- and post-implementation of open notes at VCU Medical Center (Massey Cancer Center). The interviews revealed oncologists were most concerned that their colleagues documentation might change when they know patients are reading, but this has been unfounded.

In a survey of 1,628 clinicians who had a year or more of experience sharing notes (with at least one patient who read a note), 37% of doctors reported spending more time in documentation and changing the way they wrote notes, including documenting sensitive information and changing language that might be perceived as critical of patients.

==== Clinicians reading their own notes ====
A study at Vanderbilt University Medical Center (VUMC) showed that 42% of employees who view their own medical records directly through the electronic health record (EHR) are using the EHR to view their clinical notes. During the 5-year study period than 28,000 employees were allowed access to their records through the EHR, and 79.4% had logged in at least once. At the time of the study, clinical notes were not shared through the VUMC patient portal.

==== Patient views of open notes ====
Over multiple surveys, people who have experience reading clinician's visit notes continue to report understanding all or nearly all of their notes (93-98%) and find them to be accurate. People who say they do not understand much of a note say they seek out additional information/clarification by using the Internet, asking a clinician, or asking a friend or family member.

One study asked people with experience reading visit notes if they had suggestions to make the note "more meaningful to patient readers." Patient suggestions included:

- Restructuring notes to put the most important information at the top
- Avoiding medical jargon, and/or including "mouse over" features in the online patient portal to define terms and acronyms
- Avoiding potentially judgmental language, such as "patient denies" or "obese"

=== Clinical documentation in an open notes environment ===
In one study of post open notes-implementation, 15-20% of clinicians reported making modest changes in their approach to medical records. While changes in documentation are typically small, some clinicians report spending more time in documentation after implementing note sharing.

Emerging best practices for writing patient-friendly notes include:

Suggestions	Examples
Avoid abbreviations	"SOB" (shortness of breath) may mean something different entirely to patients.
Avoid pejoratives such as "non-compliant" and "unreliable"	These observations are better off factually documented rather than used to describe a patient.
Avoid copying and pasting information within the chart	Patients and other clinicians may be confused by copy and paste.
Other suggestions:	Using plain language. Signing notes in a timely manner.

== Implementing open notes at health systems ==
Sharing notes with patients represents a culture change for clinical practice and may create anxiety or apprehension among clinicians. Common questions posed include "how to write/document" when patients are a potential audience for notes, the technical aspects of an open notes implementation as it relates to the electronic health records, and the demands an open notes implementation may pose on the health information management team. After the first year of implementing open notes, UW Medicine Harborview Medical Center reported the patient feedback on the transition "involved a large number of patients and notes with few reported problems" and was "uneventful."

== OurNotes (patient-entered HPI and goals) ==
OurNotes, or patient-entered history of present illness (HPI) and goals, is the concept of allowing a patient to contribute to their own medical record by updating their family and social history, writing a concise, structured interval history, and proposing a visit agenda. A component of OurNotes may involve a patient first reviewing an open visit note, but it is not a requirement. It has been hypothesized that an OurNotes approach may off-load work during a medical visit, free up time for clinicians, and reduce physician burnout, which could prove mutually beneficial for clinicians and patients.

OurNotes was first discussed in the Annals of Internal Medicine in 2018. An accompanying editorial hypothesized the concept could result in an improved "shared decision making process… thereby (encouraging patients to) follow their physicians' advice," and may save health systems billions of dollars on "medication nonadherence."

The OpenNotes organization received support from the Commonwealth Fund to further develop and research OurNotes. The initial pilot is still being conducted at Beth Israel Deaconess Medical Center, University of Washington, Dartmouth-Hitchcock Medical Center, and University of Colorado.

=== OurNotes in telemedicine ===
As a result of the COVID-19 pandemic, Beth Israel Deaconess Medical Center's pilot of OurNotes expanded to telemedicine delivery in mid-March 2020. In an article published in NEJM Catalyst, a physician recounted how she found her patient's contributions in the OurNotes pre-visit process "particularly helpful" before a telemedicine visit, which inspired the research team to modify the OurNotes form as tool for telemedicine. The modified form can be downloaded from the paper, Covid-19 as Innovation Accelerator: Cogenerating Telemedicine Visit Notes with Patients. The form is Creative Commons Attribution 4.0 International (CC BY 4.0).

"e-Patient" Dave DeBronkart blogged about his experience with OurNotes for telemedicine, saying the telemedicine visit was made easier "by being given a structured way to prepare for my visit."

== Health systems sharing visit notes with patients ==
More than 44,000,000 patients have access to clinical notes at 210 health systems in North America. In 2013, the U.S. Department of Veteran's Affairs (VHA) introduced an enhanced version of its Blue Button personal health record, including access to clinical notes.

== Related U.S. public policy ==
The 21st Century Cures Act, passed by the U.S. Congress in 2016, requires patients be offered access to all the health information in their electronic medical records without charge by the provider, including the notes their clinicians write. In 2020 the Office of the National Coordinator for Health IT published the final program rule for the Cures Act on Interoperability, Information Blocking, and ONC Health IT Certification mandating that clinical notes be available on request, in a format the patient wants. How and when this rule will be enforced is in the process of being clarified.

== See also ==
- Blue Button
- Electronic health record
- Fast Healthcare Interoperability Resources
- Health Information Technology for Economic and Clinical Health Act
- Health Insurance Portability and Accountability Act
- Patient portal
- Personal health record
- Shared decision-making in medicine
- Medical record
- SOAP note
