= Francis Timothy de Dombal =

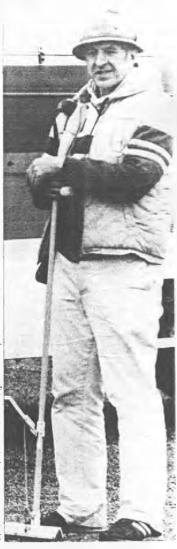
Tim de Dombal cleaning a medical unit in a photo by Frank Hall.

Francis Timothy de Dombal, or Tim de Dombal (1937 – 1995) was a pioneer researcher of the Medical Officers Group notable for his role in the development of medical informatics and telehealth (healthcare telematics), that invented the computer-aided decision support (CADSS) and AAPHelp, both computer-aided diagnosis decision support systems (DSS), in his work along the University of Leeds. He also worked for the World Health Organization (WHO) and National Aero Space Agency (NASA).

== Legacy ==
He is currently considered by the scientific community to be one of the first researchers of health data and artificial intelligence (AI) due to the role of artificial intelligence in healthcare.
