= Zöe Webster =

British AI specialist

Zoë Webster
- Education: University of York University of Sussex
- Employer(s): Cambridge Management Consultants, BT Group, Innovate UK for 13 years,QinetiQ
- Known for: expertise in artificial intelligence and diversity in strategy for computing development
- Awards: AI Magazine Top Ten Women in AI in UK and Europe (2024)

Zoë Webster is a British specialist in artificial intelligence.

Webster is an independent AI consultant and an Associate with Cambridge Management Consultants. Previously she was the Artificial Intelligence Director, Group Data and AI Solutions at multinational BT Group, and was Director of Artificial intelligence and data economy at Innovate UK, a non-governmental agency reporting to UK Research and Innovation (UKRI). Webster had worked there for thirteen years as it established to strategies to help industry to allow innovators to connect and showcase their work and access markets. The overall aim was to ensure that the UK achieves its strategy for innovation in computing and related spheres across public and private domains. She provided advice to the UK House of Lords’ Communications and Digital Committee on Large language models, assessing opportunities and risks. And in 2019 she became a board member of the Scottish government's innovation strategy partner, Data Lab.

== Education and career ==
Webster was in the first generation of her family to attend university, although her father was an electrician with an interest in reading about technology, including Isaac Asimov,. She initially studied sixth form A-levels in politics, maths and economics, but changed from politics to computing, because of the example of a two-woman computing department, although there were only three female students in the class. Her first degree was in computer science at York University and she then took an MSc at Sussex, including psychology and philosophy. She worked at QinetiQ, a technical defence company and completed her PhD, whilst working full-time. Webster began with the UK research innovation development organisation (which has changed its name and reporting line, now Innovate UK), back in 2007, and was developing and implementing the UK national strategy for ICT and then in charge of Enabling technology, High-Value manufacturing and Strategy. In 2020, she became Artificial Intelligence Director, Group Data and AI Solutions at multinational BT Group.

=== Interest in diversity in computing and the role of AI ===
Webster has supported diversity throughout her career and said 'We need more women in technology because they have something to add to the field, not because they’re simply making up the numbers'. She takes the wider need for diverse engagement in AI seriously to enable the strategy for emerging and developing technology to provide useful support across the widest spectrum of society. Her opinion was that “Young people need to be taught that technology can create change, and that an awful lot of it is actually fun, too.”

Webster believes that the use of robots will grow and "hopefully assist us in really helpful ways". She has studied the interface of human and machine intelligence, developing policy and strategy as well as undertaking R&D in two of the major commercial companies developing intelligent machines, using methods to mitigate bias. Her role included working with CodeFirstGirls, who support diverse training to offer work experience in technical companies, with 15 places offered in BT.

== External sources ==
Presentation about the role of innovation in technology (Port of Tyne) at AI Magazine event.
