= Principles for a Data Economy =

The Principles for a Data Economy – Data Rights and Transactions is a transatlantic legal project carried out jointly by the American Law Institute (ALI) and the European Law Institute (ELI). The Principles for a Data Economy deals with a range of different legal questions that arise in the data economy. Since data is different from other tradeable items, the Principles draw up legal rules for data transactions and data rights that take into account the interests of different stakeholders involved in the data economy. The Principles are designed to facilitate contractual relations as well as the drafting of model agreements and can guide courts and legislators worldwide.

The project proposes a set of principles that can be implemented in any legal system and is designed to work in conjunction with any kind of data privacy/data protection law, intellectual property law or trade secret law. The Principles do not address or seek to change any of the substantive rules of these bodies of law.

The Project Team consists of Neil B Cohen and Christiane Wendehorst (as Project Reporters) and Lord John Thomas as well as Steven O. Weise (as Project Chairs).

== Characteristics of data ==
The law governing trades in commerce has historically focused on trade in items that are tangible like goods or on intangible assets, such as shares or licenses. However, data does not fit into any of these traditional categories, nor does it qualify as a service. It is often unclear how traditional legal rules and doctrines can apply to data, as data is different from other assets in many ways. For example, data can be multiplied at basically no cost and can be used in parallel for a variety of different purposes by many different people at the same time (data is a “non-rivalrous” resource). Uncertainty regarding the applicable rules to govern the data economy may inhibit innovation and growth and trouble stakeholders like data-driven industries, start-ups, and consumers.

== Stakeholders in the data economy ==
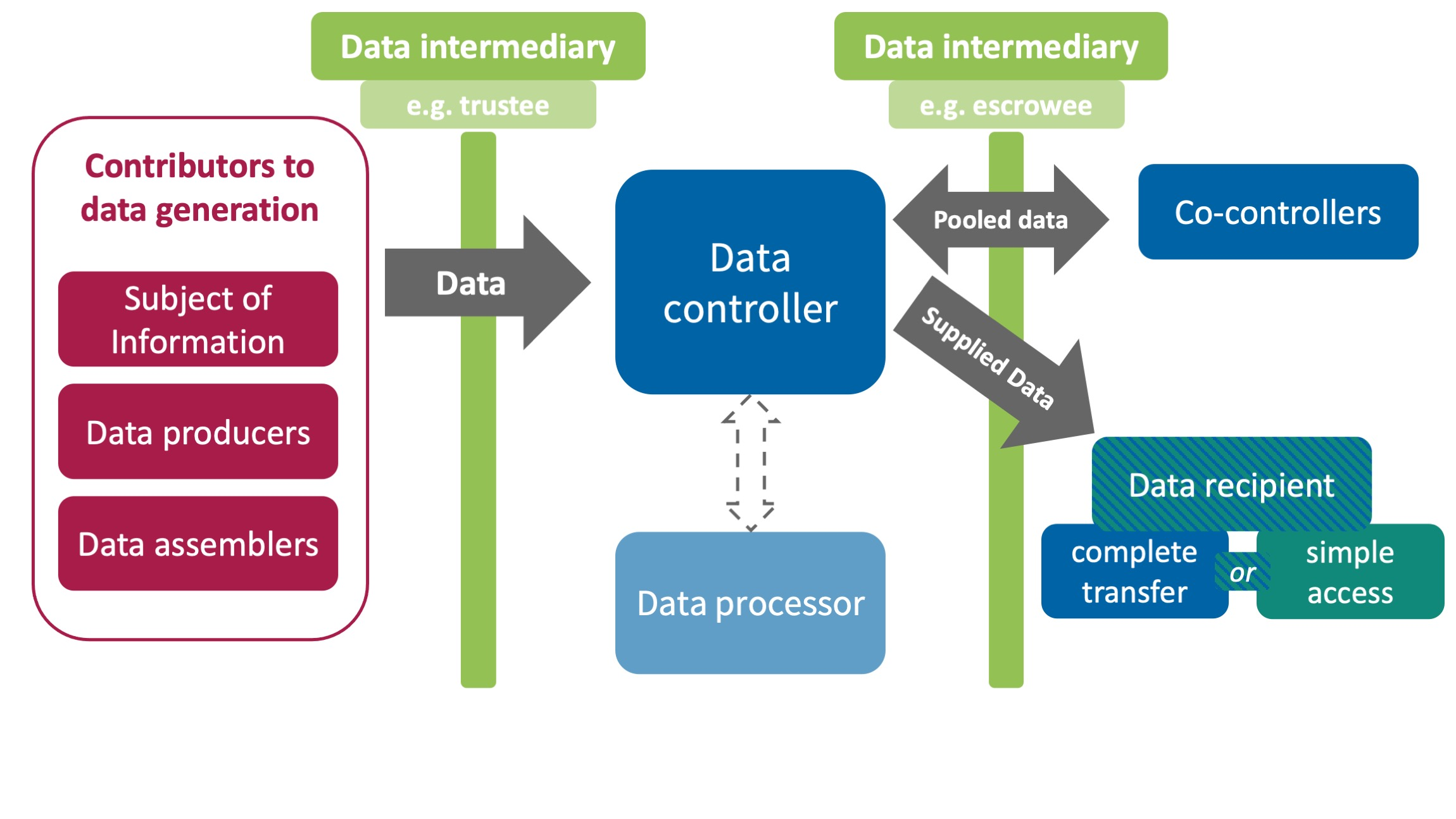
Stakeholders in the data economy – a simplified overview

The Principles have taken the basic types of players and relations which can be found in data ecosystems as a starting point to provide guidance in different situations. The central actors in the data economy are data controllers (also called “data holders”). They are in a position to access the data and decide for which purposes and means this data should be processed. A controller may exercise control all by itself or share it with co-controllers, such as under a data pooling arrangement. Data processors provide the processing of data on a controller’s behalf as a service. Another important group of stakeholders includes those that contribute to the generation of data (e.g. data subjects). Other players in the data economy include data assemblers or data intermediaries (e.g. data trusts).

== History of the project and timeline ==
Before the official adoption of the project by ALI and ELI bodies in 2018, the project team carried out a Feasibility Study from October 2016 to February 2018. In the following years, the project team produced a number of drafts (e.g. “Preliminary Drafts” No. 1 to 4, “Tentative Draft No. 1”) and project progress were regularly discussed with advisory bodies and members of both the ALI and the ELI. The project reporters also included feedback and insights from industry stakeholders and experts that was gained after several meetings and workshops, hosted, inter alia by UNCITRAL, UNIDROIT and several national governmental institutions. Tentative Draft No. 2 was presented at the ALI Annual Meeting in May 2021 and approved by ALI membership. The latest draft ("Final Council Draft") was also approved by the ELI Council and ELI Membership. The Principles for a Data Economy were presented at an international conference with representatives from institutions such as the Uniform Law Commission (ULC), the European Commission, UNIDROIT, the OECD, the International Chamber of Commerce (ICC) and the World Economic Forum (WEF) in October 2021.

== Project structure ==
The current draft (“Tentative Draft No. 2”) of the Principles consists of five Parts that each governs different aspects of the data economy:

- General Provisions,
- Data Contracts,
- Data Rights,
- Third Party Aspects of Data Activities, and
- Multi-State Issues.

=== General Provisions ===
Part I includes general provisions that apply to all other Parts of the Principles for a Data Economy. This Part sets out the purpose of the Principles: they aim to make existing law in the field of the data economy more coherent and support the development of the law in this field by courts and legislators worldwide. It is also clarified that the Principles have a wide scope of application and can be used in a variety of ways by stakeholders in the data economy. The Principles may, for example, serve private parties as a basis for contract formation, guide the deliberations of arbitral tribunals or inspire national legislation. Part I then defines several key terms, such as ‘digital data’ and ‘data right’. The scope of the Principles is limited to matters where information is recorded as an asset, resource or tradeable commodity and where large amounts of data, rather than single pieces of information, are concerned. This Part also clarifies that remedies with respect to data contracts and data rights are left to the applicable national law.

=== Data Contracts ===
Part II lists different types of contracts that often occur in the data economy and establishes two broad categories, namely contracts for the supply and sharing of data and contracts for services with regard to data. Contracts for the supply and sharing of data include, e.g. data transfer contracts or data pooling arrangements, while contracts for services with regard to data cover contracts for the processing of data or data intermediary contracts. The Principles provide default terms for each contract type, on issues such as the manner in which data should supply or which characteristics the data supplied should meet. These default terms 'automatically' become part of the contract unless the parties agree otherwise.

=== Data Rights ===
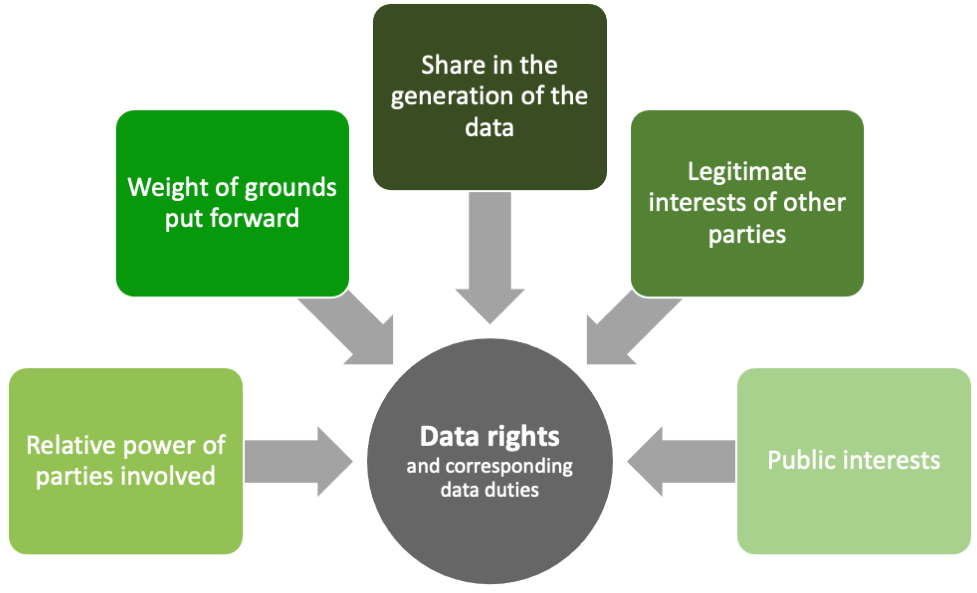
Factors determining rights in co-generated data

Part III governs legally protected interests of players in the data economy that stem from the characteristics of data as a resource (e.g. its non-rivalrous nature) or from public interest considerations. Such data rights may include the right to data access, the right to require the controller to desist from data activities or to correct incorrect/incomplete data, or even to receive an economic share in profits derived from the use of data. For example, the Principles deal with data rights of stakeholders that had a share in the co-generation of data and identify different factors to be considered in determining whether to afford a party a data right.

The underlying idea that parties who have contributed to the generation of data should have some rights in the utilization of the data is also recognized by governmental institutions, such as by the Japanese Ministry of Economy, Trade and Industry (METI), and the term co-generated data, which was coined by the Principles for a Data Economy, has been adopted, inter alia by the European Commission, the German Data Ethics Commission and the Global Partnership on Artificial Intelligence (GPAI). This Part also deals with data rights for the public interest, such as data sharing rights in the field of innovation.

=== Third Party Aspects ===
Part IV governs different situations in which data transactions interfere with the rights of third parties. Such rights include intellectual property rights or rights derived from data privacy or data protection law. This Part sets out under which circumstances data activities should be considered wrongful vis à vis another party. For example, a data activity (like data processing or the onward supply of data) could be considered wrongful, if a controller interferes with the rights of data subjects that are protected by data-protection law. A data activity could also be wrongful if the controller is non-compliant with contractual limitations on data activities, enforceable by the protected party (e.g. a controller may only process data for a certain purpose). If someone obtained access to data by unauthorized means (i.e. data “theft”) this could also be considered wrongful. The Part on Third-Party Aspects also takes a detailed look at the effects of the onward supply of data can have on third parties, while balancing the protection of third parties on the one hand, with the interests of data recipients and the desire to encourage data sharing on the other.

=== Multi-State Issues ===
As transactions in the data economy are international by nature and hardly occur within one legal system alone, the Part V of the Principles also briefly touches upon the applicability of the rules and doctrines of private international law to such transactions.

== Links ==
- Website of the “Principles for a Data Economy – Data Rights and Transactions”: https://principlesforadataeconomy.org
- Project page on the website of the American Law Institute: https://www.ali.org/projects/show/data-economy/
- Project page on the website of the European Law Institute: https://www.europeanlawinstitute.eu/projects-publications/current-projects-upcoming-projects-and-other-activities/current-projects/data-economy/
- Project page on “The ALI Adviser” blog: https://thealiadviser.org/data-economy/
- Project Feature on Vimeo (by the American Law Institute): https://vimeo.com/524538197
- Project webinar on Youtube (by the European Law Institute): https://www.youtube.com/watch?v=j43o85CU4WU
