= Personal health application =

Health information systems

Personal health applications (PHA) are tools and services in medical informatics which utilizes information technologies to aid individuals to create their own personal health information. These next generation consumer-centric information systems help improve health care delivery, self-management and wellness by providing clear and complete information, which increases understanding, competence and awareness. Personal health applications are part of the Medicine 2.0 movement.

== Definition ==
Personal Health Application is an electronic tool for storing, managing, and sharing health information in illness and wellness by an individual in a secure and confidential environment.

== Benefits ==
Most people do not carry medical records when they leave home. They do not realize that in an emergency, these medical records can make a big difference; additionally, it is hard to predict when an emergency might occur. In fact, they could save a life. Previous medications, history of allergy to medications, and other significant medical or surgical history can help a health professional, through PHA tools, to optimize treatment.

A Personal Health Application (PHA) tool contains a patient's personal data (name, date of birth, and other demographic details). It also includes a patient's diagnosis or health condition and details about the various treatment/assessments delivered by health professionals during an episode of care from a health care provider. It contains an individual's health-related information accumulated during an entire lifetime.

== See also ==
- eHealth
- mHealth
- Personal health record
