= Blue Button =

System for access to personal health records

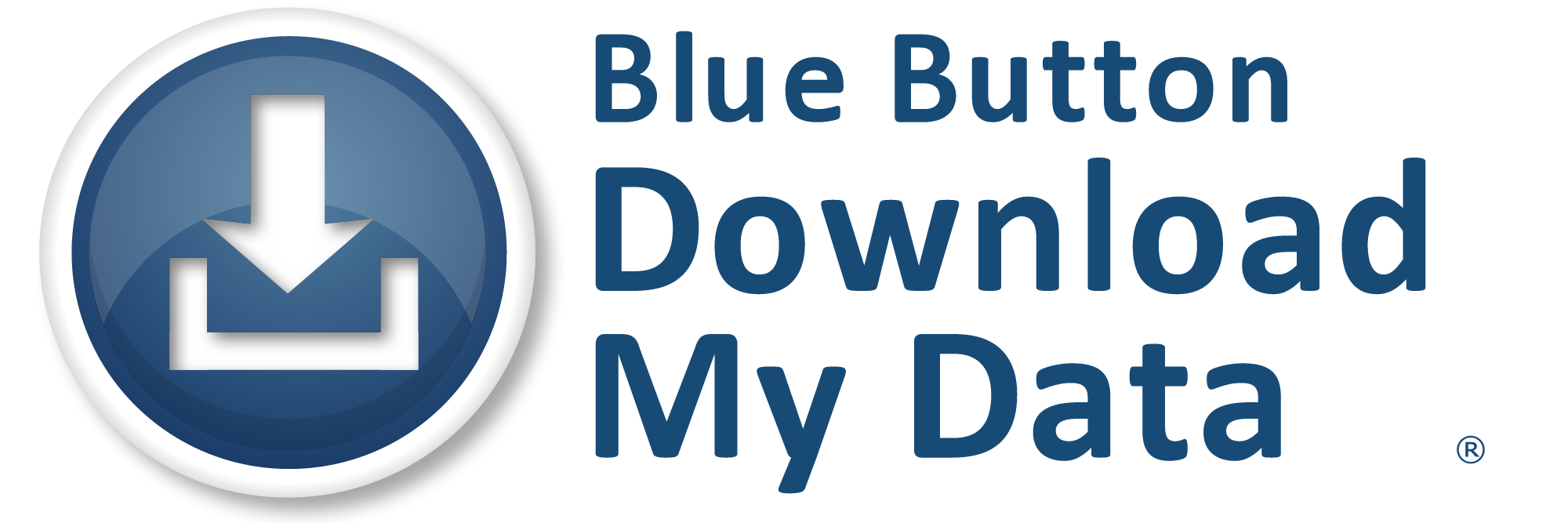
- Developers: United States Department of Veterans Affairs; United States Department of Health and Human Services; United States Department of Defense
- Release: 2010
- Type: Personal health record; Health information technology; Electronic health record
- License: Public initiative (trademark held by United States Department of Health and Human Services)
- Website: www.healthit.gov/bluebutton

The Blue Button is a system for patients to view online and download their own personal health records. Several Federal agencies, including the Departments of Defense, Health and Human Services, and Veterans Affairs, implemented this capability for their beneficiaries. In addition, Blue Button has pledges of support from numerous health plans and some vendors of personal health record vendors across the United States. Data from Blue Button-enabled sites can be used to create portable medical histories that facilitate dialog among health care providers, caregivers, and other trusted individuals or entities.

As of 2013, widespread Blue Button usage supported downloading human-readable data in ASCII. In January 2013, the Office of the National Coordinator for Health IT announced an implementation guide for data holders and developers to enable automated data exchange among Blue Button+ compliant applications using structured data formats. Blue Button+ is designed to enhance the ways consumers get and share their health information in human-readable and machine-readable formats; and to enable the use of this information in third-party applications.

In August 2025, The Conference Board identified Blue Button 2.0 as a key component of a federal health data access initiative aimed at expanding beneficiary access by enabling connections among electronic health record platforms, payer systems, and third-party application developers.

== History ==
=== Origins ===
The Blue Button initiative, part of a larger program called "MyData", began during the Markle Foundation Work Group on Consumer Engagement meeting in New York City on January 27, 2010. At the time, Meaningful Use was newly authorized and dominated health care IT dialogue in the United States. Members of the Markle Connecting for Health Community felt that while Meaningful Use criteria embraced patient engagement, the rules should also "[c]onsider individuals as information participants—not as mere recipients, but as information contributors, knowledge creators, and shared decision makers and care planners." Markle convened the Work Group on Consumer Engagement to focus on using health information technology (IT) to achieve this kind of patient engagement.

The January 2010 meeting included representatives from private industry, not-for-profit foundations, and the federal government. Kim Nazi, performance and evaluation manager for VA's My HealtheVet personal health record (PHR) and a VA representative to the Work Group, said the attendees were from diverse backgrounds and that the discussion was "passionate".

The Department of Defense (DoD) first provided secure on-line access to patient health information in December 2009 with its Tricare Online (TOL) portal. In 2010, the DoD rebranded under the "Blue Button" construct and enabled health record downloads as well as access. The DoD has added additional health record information over time and continues to enhance its Blue Button features.

The Work Group discussed many challenges related to engaging patients: numerous health IT data standards, data confidentiality and privacy laws, and fortress-like health databases. VA Chief Technology Officer (CTO) Peter L. Levin, also an attendee at the Markle Work Group meeting, described trying to balance the benefits of data standards with getting a solution to patients quickly. He assessed that it was only when the group decided to break the problem down into the simplest possible solutions that they were able to progress.

A central theme emerged from the dialogue: give patients their data. HHS CTO and U.S. CTO Todd Park summarized the decision as: "Look, there's all this complicated stuff happening with health information. But why can't we just do this: why can't we just let an American get a copy of their own information? [A]nd don't worry about the format, don't worry about the standards." The group agreed to create a large, prominent button that would represent data liquidity and access.

=== Implementation ===
In August 2010, President Barack Obama announced that Veterans could soon "go to the VA website, click a simple blue button, download or print your personal health records, so you have them when you need them and can share them with your doctors . . . ."

VA launched the Blue Button later that month (see "Growth of Blue Button", below). In October 2010, US Chief Technology Officer Aneesh Chopra, Health & Human Services Chief Technology Officer Todd Park, and VA Chief Technology Officer Peter L. Levin announced that VA and HHS’s Center for Medicare and Medicaid Services were offering Blue Button downloads to Veterans and to Medicare beneficiaries.

Blue Button was designed to empower patients with their own health data and improve the quality of patient-clinician interactions with the expectation that these would contribute to enhanced quality of life, better treatment outcomes and potential reduction in costs. The framework on which Blue Button is based—including patient empowerment, data security and privacy protection – draws heavily on work by the Markle Foundation’s collaborative of industry stakeholders.

In September 2012, the Blue Button trademark was transferred from the Veterans Administration to the U.S. Department of Health and Human Services.

=== Standardization & Interoperability ===
In 2012, efforts began by the Standards & Interoperability Framework to standardize the content formats and transport mechanisms for Blue Button data in order to make them more interoperable between health data-holding organizations, patients, and patient-authorized 3rd-parties such as physicians, caregivers, as well as applications and services.

In January 2013, ONC unveiled the Blue Button+ Implementation Guide to provide guidance to both data holders and third-party application developers to enable automated data exchange and data parsing features. The Blue Button+ implementation guide specifies appropriate structured data formats, transmission protocols, and APIs for developers to use when creating applications that rely on automated exchange of Blue Button-accessible health record data.

== Functions ==
The Blue Button is a symbol on a website—for example, an online patient portal provided by a health care provider or insurer—that patients may use to download their health information. Depending on the implementation, users can download a variety of information in multiple formats, including text and PDF. At the Department of Veterans Affairs, Veterans can download their self-entered information, such as additional insurance, and information from their medical record, including medications, allergies, and lab results. They can also download their military personnel information like occupation specialty and pay details. Users of Department of Defense's Tricare Online can use the Blue Button to download their medications, allergies, and lab results as a PDF or text file. Organizations like Medicare or Aetna offer health claims information as a downloadable text file.

Using Blue Button, patients have an easy way to retrieve and keep track of their health. Blue Button offers physicians an easy way to provide that data to patients. The simplicity of the Blue Button format allows users to carry their health information which ever way suits them—print, thumb drive, or on their smart phone. Developers can create applications to enhance the use of this data, such as the application offered by Northrop Grumman.

== Growth of Blue Button ==
VA launched the Blue Button function on its patient portal, My HealtheVet, in August, 2010. By May 2012, more than 500,000 individual (unique) Veterans had used the Blue Button to download their data. They opt-in to be able to download their health data, first by registering for a My HealtheVet account, and second, by validating their identity for privacy and security reasons, which includes appointment information, prescriptions and medications, laboratory results, vital signs and readings, military health history, and military occupations. In August 2012, the Department of Veterans Affairs announced that the Blue Button has one million registered patients.

The Center for Medicare and Medicaid Services (CMS) launched its version of Blue Button in September, 2010 on the My Medicare patient portal, giving 40 million beneficiaries online access to their Medicare claims. The Department of Defense also added a Blue Button function to its Tricare Online patient portal in 2010.

In July, 2011, the VA Innovation Initiative sponsored the Blue Button for All Americans Contest to encourage widespread use and assure that all Veterans had access to their Blue Button health data regardless of whether they sought care from VA or from a private non-VA health care provider. In October 2011, McKesson Corporation’s Relay Health Division won VA’s Blue Button contest by adding Blue Button functions to the patient portals which it offers through its 200,000 physician and 2,000 hospital clients. These represent slightly less than one third of physicians and slightly more than one third of hospitals in the United States.

In September, 2011, the Robert Wood Johnson Foundation launched a website to advocate cross-industry use of the Blue Button; its website collects the pledges of industry adopters of the technology, including United Health Care, Humana, Patients Like Me, Walgreens, and others.

One of those pledging support, Aetna, announced in September 2011 that it had added the Blue Button function to its patient portal, and in addition offered its beneficiaries the ability to share their Blue Button downloads with Aetna providers. At the time, Aetna said it served more than 36 million people. United Health Group began offering Blue Button downloads to its commercial health plan beneficiaries in July 2012, rolling out the capability to its customers. The company expects 26 million plan beneficiaries will have access to Blue Button downloads by mid-2013.

Other private sector organizations contributed to the growth of Blue Button. For example:

- Iatric Systems, Inc., a hospital-focused EHR vendor, includes the Blue Button on the patient portals of its products.
- Humetrix, Inc., offers a mobile Blue Button application through which patients can send their Blue Button data directly to their physicians.
- Microsoft HealthVault and Dossia, which are patient-controlled repositories of personal health information, each accept Blue Button data.
- Napersoft, Inc., a consumer communications management software company, uses Blue Button in its Talk2Health product to transmit data between patients, payers and providers.

In December 2011, the U.S. Office of Personnel Management announced that it had requested all federal employee health benefit plans to add the Blue Button function to their patient portals. FEHB’s health benefit plans are offered by more than 200 insurance carriers and serve approximately eight million federal employees (including Members of Congress), their families, and retirees.

In May 2012, the Obama administration announced the White House Presidential Innovation Fellows which will focus on five program areas including expanding Blue Button capabilities nationwide. The Office of the National Coordinator for Health IT wants to expand Blue Button to any patient in America. In 2012, the ONC launched the Automate Blue Button Standards and Interoperability Framework Initiative, which culminated in 2013 with the release of the Blue Button+ Implementation Guide.

In 2012, ONC held the Blue Button Mashup Challenge to encourage the development of third-party applications that increase the usefulness of data downloaded via Blue Button. The first-prize winner, iBlueButton, is a smart phone app that takes data from Medicare’s online portal and organizes it into an easier to read, easier to navigate format. The second-prize winner, ID BlueButton, is a tablet-based application that parses health information downloaded through Blue Button and presents it in a form that more clearly shows changes in health indicators and medication use over time. The third-prize winner, InstantPHR, is a web app that uses data downloaded through Blue Button to automatically populate personal health records in Microsoft HealthVault.

== Blue Button+ ==
Blue Button+ extended the Blue Button concept to include a standardized data format and additional functionality for trusted, automated exchange of health data, and advanced parsing of health data to improve human readability. In January 2013, ONC released the Blue Button+ Implementation Guide, offering guidance and a toolkit for both data holders (such as health care providers and insurers) and third-party application developers seeking to add this functionality to their products and services. The Blue Button+ Implementation Guide represented a collaboration among more than 68 volunteer organizations. In September 2014 an updated Blue Button Toolkit was released to replace the Blue Button Implementation Guide. The current version—the Blue Button 2.0 Implementation Guide issued in 2018—includes the FHIR (Fast Health Interoperable Resources) standard for transmission of data.

SMART Platforms, Harvard Medical School, and Boston Children’s Hospital built a proof-of-concept Blue Button+ app called Growth-tastic. With Growth-tastic, parents could view charts of their child’s height, weight, and BMI trended over time.

== Usage and licensing ==
Originally, in 2010, organizations needed a license to use the Blue Button marks. As of September 2012, application and licensing is no longer required. Usage of the Blue Button logo and brand is free, but must conform to the established usage guidelines set by the U.S. Department of Health and Human Services.

== Green Button and Red Button ==
Blue Button is part of a larger "My Data Initiative" that aims to empower consumers with the tools and information they need to make optimal choices. Other, similar "button" projects include the Green Button (for personal energy usage data) and the Red Button (for personal educational data).

In September 2011, US CTO Aneesh Chopra challenged the energy industry to model a Green Button, off the successful Blue Button, where energy providers would give energy users their consumption data in an easy to read and use format at the click of the button. In January 2012, two major California utilities—Pacific Gas & Electric and San Diego Gas & Electric—announced their implementation of Green Button. Energy customers can manage their consumption via their smart phones using the standard Green Button data format.

The National Institute of Standards and Technology awarded a contract to HyperTek Inc. to work with developers and users to expand the Green Button initiative.

== Related initiatives ==
In healthcare, there is a related proposal for a Green Button, as a way for doctors to use summarized patient data for real time decision making at the point of care. A related, patient-driven, green button initiative to promote the donation of medical data analogous to donation of organs.

== Awards ==
Department of Defense's implementation of the Blue Button was awarded one of the 10 GCN 2011 awards.

The Federal Blue Button team was selected as a finalist by the Partnership for Public Service for the Citizen Services Medal for their contributions to implementing Blue Button at Departments of Defense, Health and Human Services, and Veterans Affairs.

== See also ==
- Data economy
- MyChart
