= Electronic health record (Germany) =

German digital medical records system

The Electronic health record (German: Elektronische Patientenakte or ePA) was launched on 1 January 2021, for comprehensive digital connectivity within the German healthcare system for patients, between patient and service providers, and between service providers for both hospital settings and primary care. The intent was to provide health care data in a digital form so that it was accessible nationwide for both patients that are statutorily insured as well as practitioners of those patients, with the patient controlling who can access their data. As of January 15, 2025, all people with statutory health insurance in Germany are automatically assigned an ePA unless they opt out. The trial period was undertaken for practitioners in three model regions (Franconia, Hamburg, and parts of North Rhine-Westphali). Data of the ePA will be made accessible for defined research purposes if insured persons do not explicitly object to them. According to instructions from the Federal Ministry of Health (BMG) to Gematik from mid-April, as of October 1, 2025, it will be mandatory for office-based physicians and hospital doctors in Germany to upload medical health data into existing electronic patient records (ePAs).
