= Patient portal =

Secure website for accessing medical records or communicate with providers

Patient portals are healthcare-related online applications that allow patients to interact and communicate with their healthcare providers, such as physicians and hospitals. Typically, portal services are accessible at any time via the Internet.

Patient portal applications may be standalone websites hosted by an outside company, or can be integrated into the existing healthcare provider's website. Still others are modules added onto an existing electronic medical record (EMR) or electronic health record (EHR) system. In general, patient portals require the practice have some type of EMR, EHR, or patient management system, as the patient data needs to be securely stored in a data repository and then retrieved by the patient portal. At times, the lines between an EMR, an EHR, a personal health record, and a patient portal blur due to feature overlap.

== Features and benefits ==
The central feature that makes any system a patient portal is the ability to securely share individual patient health information through the Internet. Virtually all patient portals also allow patients to interact in some way with healthcare providers.

Patient portals benefit both patients and providers by increasing efficiency and productivity. In the United States, patient portals are also regarded as a key tool to assists physicians meet "meaningful use" requirements to receive federal incentives, especially for providing health information to patients. Some patient portal applications enable patients to register and complete forms online, which can streamline visits to clinics and hospitals. Many portal applications also enable patients to request prescription refills online, order eyeglasses and contact lenses, access medical records, pay bills, review lab results, and schedule medical appointments. According to the Office of the National Coordinator for Health Information Technology (ONC), in 2021 more than 60% of patients with access to a patient portal used it once or more over a give 12-month period."

Patient portals also typically allow patients to communicate directly with healthcare providers by asking questions, leaving comments, or sending email messages, and to receive educational materials specific to their health needs. A 2025 scoping review on patient initiated secure messages found positive association with improved clinical outcomes overall, and positive impact on efficiency and care experience. A 2023 study found a positive correlation between being able to access educational resources through a patient portal and improved patient outcomes. This study specifically found that "use of educational resources in the patient portal were associated with significant increases in: patient activation, knowledge of conditions. self-management, adoption of desired health behaviors, decision making, and decreased anxiety."

== Disadvantages ==
The major shortcoming of most patient portals is their linkage to a single health organization. If a patient uses more than one organization for healthcare, the patient typically needs to log on to each organization's portal to access information. This results in a fragmented view of individual patient data. The same 2025 scoping review that found positive association with patient experience identified 2 papers in which providers raised concern of increase burden on providers with the rise of direct patient messaging.

Additionally, even while promoting practice portals for their ease of use and positive patient outcomes, some physicians note that it is hard to encourage patients to utilize online portals to benefit both themselves and the medical practice staff. Despite positive patient outcomes and experiences, adoption rates remain low: as of 2024, 65% of U.S. healthcare users had accessed their patient portal. (Nonetheless, this is a substantial increase since 2014, when just 25% of patients accessed their portal.)

== Security ==
Healthcare providers in the US are bound to comply with HIPAA regulations. These regulations specify what patient information must be held in confidence. Something as seemingly trivial as a name is viewed by HIPAA as protected health information. For this reason, cybersecurity has always been a top concern for the industry when dealing with the adoption of patient portals. While there may be systems that are not HIPAA compliant, most patient and practice portals are secure and compliant with HIPAA regulations. The use of SSL and access control patterns are commonplace in the industry. Patient access is typically validated with a username and password. Although not required under HIPAA, security experts and the U.S. Department of Health and Human Services increasingly encourage healthcare portal to include Multi-factor authentication (MFA) in addition to usernames and passwords.

== History ==
Internet portal technology has been in common use since the 1990s. The financial industry has been particularly adept at using the Internet to grant individual users access to personal information. Possibly because of the strictness of HIPAA regulations, or the lack of financial incentives for the health care providers, the adoption of patient portals has lagged behind other market segments.

The American Recovery and Reinvestment Act of 2009 (ARRA), in particular the HITECH Act within ARRA, sets aside approximately $19 billion for health information technology. This funding was intended to offset the costs of electronic medical record systems for practicing physicians. Because the conversion to electronic medical records is typically complex, systems often transition to patient portals first and then follow with a complete implementation of electronic medical records.

To attest to Meaningful Use Stage 2, eligible professionals must have 5 percent of their patients view, transmit, or download their health information. Additionally, providers must implement notifications for follow-up appointments and identify clinically relevant health information for more than 10 percent of their patients with two or more appointments in the preceding two years.

Consequently, personal health record systems are becoming more common and available. In 2012, 57 percent of providers already had a patient portal. At present, individual health data are located primarily on paper in physicians' files. Patient portals have been developed to give patients better access to their information. Given patient mobility and the development of clear interoperable standards, the best documentation of patient medical history may involve data stored outside physician offices.

== Future ==
E-visits (remote use of medical services) may soon become one of the most commonly used patient portal features. The most likely demographic for uptake of e-visits are patients who live in remote rural areas, far from clinical services. A telehealth visit would be much cheaper and more convenient than traveling a long distance, especially for simple questions or minor medical complaints.

Providing a route that does not require in-person patient clinic visits may potentially benefit both patients and providers. Many organizations find that overall utilization drops when e-visits are implemented, in some places by as much as 25%. This makes e-visits a very interesting proposition for insurance companies, although few actually reimburse for them currently. With proper functionality, E-visits also allow the patient to update their allergies, vital signs, and history information.

The utility of patient portals can be expanded to cover other purposes as well. For example, health systems can use the patient portal to disseminate education materials to patients. The incorporation of AI chatbots within the patient portals are also being explored.

== Vendors ==
Some vendors, such as athenahealth, AdvancedMD, Epic Systems, Veradigm, and Oracle Health offer patient portals as one module of a complete electronic health record (EHR) system or as modules that can be integrated into other EHRs.

Recent market surveys have highlighted best of breed, or applications that excel at one or two functions, are losing ground to portals provided by large vendors. While best of breed portals are better equipped for interoperability, portals supplied by larger vendors may be overall better equipped to handle the patient engagement requirements of Meaningful Use Stage 2.

== See also ==
- Health care
- Health informatics
- Electronic health record
- Personal health record
