= World Mental Health survey initiative =

The World Mental Health Survey Initiative is a collaborative project by World Health Organization, Harvard University, University of Michigan, and country-based researchers worldwide to coordinate the analysis and implementation of epidemiological surveys of mental and behavioral disorders and substance abuse in all WHO Regions.

== Aim ==
It is estimated that the burden of mental and addictive disorders are among the highest in the world with expected increase over the next decades. However, those estimations are not based on cross-sectional epidemiological surveys, rather, they are mainly based on literature reviews and isolated studies. The WMH Survey Initiative aim is to accurately address the global burden of mental disorders by obtaining accurate cross-sectional information about the prevalences and correlates of mental and behavioral disorders as well as substance abuse, allowing for evaluation of risk factors and study of patterns of service use in order to target appropriate interventions.

== Funding Sources ==
According to its peer-reviewed published literature, the WMH Survey Initiative is funded by the United States National Institute of Mental Health (NIMH; R01 MH070884), the John D. and Catherine T. MacArthur Foundation, the Pfizer Foundation, the United States Public Health Service (R13-MH066849, R01-MH069864, and R01 DA016558), the Fogarty International Center (FIRCA R03-TW006481), the Pan American Health Organization, Eli Lilly and Company, Ortho-McNeil Pharmaceutical Inc., GlaxoSmithKline, and Bristol-Myers Squibb.

== Collaborators ==
Collaborators in this survey come from all WHO regions of the world, with 27 participating countries.

WHO Region	Countries
Eastern Mediterranean Regional Office (EMRO)	Iraq
Eastern Mediterranean Regional Office (EMRO)	Lebanon
Pan American Health Organization (PAHO)	Argentina
Pan American Health Organization (PAHO)	Brazil
Pan American Health Organization (PAHO)	Colombia
Pan American Health Organization (PAHO)	Mexico
Pan American Health Organization (PAHO)	Peru
Pan American Health Organization (PAHO)	United States
African Regional Office (AFRO)	Nigeria
African Regional Office (AFRO)	South Africa
European Regional Office (EURO)	Belgium
European Regional Office (EURO)	Bulgaria
European Regional Office (EURO)	France
European Regional Office (EURO)	Germany
European Regional Office (EURO)	Italy
European Regional Office (EURO)	Netherlands
European Regional Office (EURO)	Northern Ireland
European Regional Office (EURO)	Poland
European Regional Office (EURO)	Portugal
European Regional Office (EURO)	Romania
European Regional Office (EURO)	Spain
European Regional Office (EURO)	Ukraine
Western Pacific Regional Office (WPRO)	Australia
Western Pacific Regional Office (WPRO)	China
Western Pacific Regional Office (WPRO)	Japan
Western Pacific Regional Office (WPRO)	New Zealand
