= Data economy =

Type of economy

A data economy is a global digital ecosystem in which data is gathered, organized, and exchanged by a network of companies, individuals, and institutions to create economic value. The raw data is collected by a variety of factors, including search engines, social media websites, online vendors, brick and mortar vendors, payment gateways, software as a service (SaaS) purveyors, and an increasing number of firms deploying connected devices on the Internet of Things (IoT). Once collected, this data is typically passed on to individuals or firms, often for a fee. In the United States, the Consumer Financial Protection Bureau and other agencies have developed early models to regulate the data economy.

Storing and securing collected data represent a significant portion of the data economy.

== Data economy categories ==
=== Big data economy ===
Big data is defined as the algorithm-based analysis of large-scale, distinct digital data for purposes of prediction, measurement, and governance.

This involves processing vast amounts of information from various sources, like social media, sensors, or online transactions, using advanced computer programs (algorithms). These algorithms help uncover patterns, trends, and insights that would be impossible to identify manually, enabling applications such as predicting consumer behavior or optimizing city traffic systems.

=== Data barter ===
Data barter occurs when goods or services are exchanged for customer data, typically at a zero monetary price. This phenomenon is common in digital services such as free apps, where the value of the data collected can be substantial. Data barter may not be captured by traditional GDP measures, leading to potential underestimation of economic activity.

=== Partial data barter ===
In the process of economic transactions, firms acquire data about customers: the goods they purchased, the time at which they shopped or perhaps a means of payment, zip code or operating system. This data is valuable to firms. Firms that value such data should have an extra incentive do more transactions to gather more data. To do more transactions, a firm needs to lower its price or offer a higher-quality product at the same price, to induce more customers to come. Profit maximization dictates that firms that value data should offer customers lower prices (per unit of quality or quantity). This decline in the price, which is compensated for by the transfer of valuable data, is referred to as partial data barter.

=== Human-driven data economy ===
The human-driven data economy is a fair and functioning data economy in which data is controlled and used fairly and ethically in a human-oriented manner. The human-driven data economy is linked to the MyData Movement and is a human-centered approach to personal data management.

This means that individuals have the ability to decide how their personal information is used and shared, ensuring transparency and accountability. It also aims to create systems where data contributes to societal benefits without compromising individual rights.

=== Personal data economy ===
The personal data economy is created by individuals using personal data, which people supply either directly or indirectly. Consumers become suppliers and controllers.

=== Algorithm economy ===
In an algorithm economy, companies and individuals can buy, sell, trade, or donate individual algorithms or apps pieces, by leveraging dedicated marketplaces.

== Transition to data economy ==
=== Market size ===
The size of the EU data economy was estimated to be more than €285 billion in 2015, representing over 1.94% of the EU GDP. Key sectors in the data economy either are or are on the way to becoming data-driven. For example, the manufacturing, agriculture, automotive, smart living environments, telecommunications, healthcare, and pharma industries are at the core of the data economy.

=== Challenges ===
Approaches to data breaches are problematic. Challenging issues include compensation to victims, incentives for enterprises to invest in data security, and uncertainties for corporations about regulatory burdens and litigation risks. Furthermore, data portability might decrease interest in innovations.

=== Regulation ===
The regulation of the data economy is closely linked to privacy. The present approach is flexibility, finding a balance between protecting privacy and allowing citizens to decide for themselves. The European Union GDPR regulation is one cornerstone of this new regulatory framework. A new paradigm for data governance is needed, with data ethics as a central component in all regulatory reforms.

== Criticism ==
The data economy raises concerns about regulatory uncertainties and incoherence, privacy, ethics, the loss of control of data, and the ownership of data and related rights. Mathematical models and algorithms based on them are too often opaque, unregulated, and incontestable.

Some concerns have been raised about internet companies controlling the flow of data and using it to gain power.

The critiques expressed in the 2012 General Data Protection Regulation (GDPR) draft of the European Commission have now led to concrete regulations:

“This is why it is time to build a stronger and more coherent data protection framework in the EU, backed by strong enforcement that will allow the digital economy to develop across the internal market, put individuals in control of their own data and reinforce legal and practical certainty for economic operators and public authorities.”

== See also ==
- Algorithms
- Artificial intelligence
- Cloud computing
- Digital economy
- Digitization economics
- Electronic business
- E-commerce
- GDPR
- Information economy
- Knowledge market
- Network economy
- New economy
