= Guideline execution engine =

A guideline execution engine is a computer program which can interpret a clinical guideline represented in a computerized format and perform actions towards the user of an electronic medical record.

A guideline execution engine needs to communicate with a host clinical information system. Virtual Medical Record (vMR) is one possible interface which can be used.

The engine's main function is to manage instances of executed guidelines of individual patients.

== Architecture ==
The following modules are generally needed for any engine:

- interface to clinical information system
- new guidelines loading module
- guideline interpreter module
- clinical events parser
- alert/recommendations dispatch

== Guideline Interchange Format ==
The Guideline Interchange Format (GLIF) is a computer representation format for clinical guidelines. Represented guidelines can be executed using a guideline execution engine.

The format has several versions as it has been improved. In 2003 GLIF3 was introduced.

== Use of third party workflow engine as a guideline execution engine ==
Some commercial electronic health record systems use a workflow engine to execute clinical guidelines. RetroGuide and HealthFlow are examples of such an approach.

== See also ==
- Arden syntax
- Medical algorithm
