= VMR =

VMR may refer to:

- Valley Metro Rail
- Variance-to-mean ratio
- Vertical Market Reseller
- Video Mixing Renderer, a DirectShow filter
- Virtual Medical Record
- Victorian Miniature Railway
- FAA location identifier for Harold Davidson Field, a small airport in Vermillion, South Dakota US
