= Continuity of Care Record =

Health record standard specification

- ASTM E2369 - 12: Standard Specification for Continuity of Care Record (CCR)
- Abbreviation: CCR
- Organization: ASTM International
- Committee: E31.25
- Base standards: XML
- Domain: Electronic health records
- License: Proprietary
- Website: www.astm.org/Standards/E2369.htm

Continuity of Care Record (CCR) is a health record standard specification developed jointly by ASTM International, the Massachusetts Medical Society (MMS), the Healthcare Information and Management Systems Society (HIMSS), the American Academy of Family Physicians (AAFP), the American Academy of Pediatrics (AAP), and other health informatics vendors.

Although there is no official "death" of the CCR standard announced anywhere, the CCR is effectively dead in any major industry use, with most organizations now transmitting documents and information with HL7 standards (V2, CDA/C-CDA, or FHIR). Another indication of its death is that the ASTM standard specification for CCR has not been updated since 2010.

== Background and scope ==
The CCR was generated by health care practitioners based on their views of the data they may want to share in any given situation. The CCR document is used to allow timely and focused transmission of information to other health professionals involved in the patient's care. The CCR aims to increase the role of the patient in managing their health and reduce error while improving continuity of patient care. The CCR standard is a patient health summary standard. It is a way to create flexible documents that contain the most relevant and timely core health information about a patient, and to send these electronically from one caregiver to another. The CCR's intent is also to create a standard of health information transportability when a patient is transferred or referred, or is seen by another healthcare professional.

== Development ==
The CCR is a unique development effort via a syndicate of the following sponsors:

- ASTM International
- Massachusetts Medical Society
- HIMSS
- American Academy of Family Physicians
- American Academy of Pediatrics
- American Medical Association
- Patient Safety Institute
- American Health Care Association
- National Association for the Support of LTC

== Content ==
The CCR data set contains a summary of the patient's health status including problems, medications, allergies, and basic information about health insurance, care documentation, and the patient's care plan. These represent a "snapshot" of a patient's health data that can be useful or possibly lifesaving, if available at the time of clinical encounter. The ASTM CCR standard's purpose is to permit easy creation by a physician using an electronic health record (EHR) system at the end of an encounter. More specifically within the CCR, there are mandated core elements in 6 sections.
These 6 sections are:

1. Header
2. Patient Identifying Information
3. Patient Financial and Insurance Information
4. Health Status of the Patient
5. Care Documentation
6. Care Plan Recommendation

== CCR standard and structure ==
Because it is expressed in the standard data interchange language known as XML, a CCR can potentially be created, read, and interpreted by any EHR or EMR software application. A CCR can also be exported to other formats, such as PDF or Office Open XML (Microsoft Word 2007 format).

The Continuity of Care Document (CCD) is an HL7 CDA implementation of the Continuity of Care Record (CCR). A CCR document can generally be converted into CCD using Extensible Stylesheet Language Transformations (XSLT), but it is not always possible to perform the inverse transformation, since some CCD features are not supported in CCR. HITSP provides reference information that demonstrates how CCD and CCR (as HITSP C32) are embedded in CDA.

Although the CCR and CCD standards could continue to coexist, with CCR providing for basic information requests and CCD servicing more detailed requests, the newer CCD standard might eventually completely supplant CCR.

== Technology ==
As mentioned, the CCR standard uses eXtensible Markup Language (XML) as it is aimed at being technology neutral to allow for maximum applicability. This specified XML coding provides flexibility that will allow users to formulate, transfer, and view the CCR in a number of ways, for example, in a browser, in a Health Level 7 (HL7) message, in a secure email, as a PDF file, as an HTML file, or as a word document. This is aimed at producing flexible expression of structured data in avenues such as electronic health record (EHR) systems. In terms of the CCR's transportability, secure carriage and transmission of the electronic file can occur via physical transport media, for example on a USB thumb drive, tablet or phone, CD ROM, or smart card, and in an electronic sense, secure transmission can occur via a network line, or the Internet.

== See also ==
- Clinical Document Architecture
- Continuity of Care Document
- Electronic health record
