= Microsoft HealthVault =

Former personal health record by Microsoft

- Microsoft HealthVault website
- Developer: Microsoft
- Release: 2007; 19 years ago
- Type: Personal health record
- Website: www.healthvault.com

Microsoft HealthVault (2007–2019) was a web-based personal health record created by Microsoft, in October 2007, to store and maintain health and fitness information. This website was for use by both individuals and healthcare professionals, and in June 2010, it expanded its services beyond the United States to include the United Kingdom.

On April 5, 2019, Microsoft announced that effective November 20, 2019, HealthVault would be closed, any data left in user accounts would be deleted, and any apps dependent on HealthVault for data would also stop working.

== Components ==
A HealthVault record stored an individual's health information. Access to a record was through a HealthVault account, which may have been authorized to access records for multiple individuals, e.g., so that a parent could manage records for their children, or a child could access their parent's records to help the parent deal with medical issues. Authorization of the account could initially be performed with the use of a Facebook account, Windows Live ID account, or an account from a limited set of other OpenID providers, but on April 6, 2016, Microsoft announced via email to users that Facebook and OpenID sign-in would not be available after 31 May 2016. After this time, when attempting to log in using these methods, a page indicating they were no longer supported was displayed.

== Authorization ==
An individual interacted with their HealthVault record through either the HealthVault website or, more typically, through an application or device that communicated with the HealthVault platform. When an individual first used a HealthVault application, they were asked to authorize the application to access a specific set of data types, and those data types were the only ones the application could use. An individual could also share either their entire health record or selected data with another interested individual, such as a doctor, relative, etc.

== Devices ==
HealthVault Connection Center allowed health and fitness data to be exchanged between selected devices (such as blood pressure monitors, heart rate watches, and the Withings WiFi bodyscale) into an individual's HealthVault record. It was also usable to find and download drivers for medical devices. Additionally, in 2014, Microsoft introduced the Microsoft Band, a fitness band powered by the Microsoft Health service that supported the Microsoft HealthVault for aggregation and integration of various services, such as MyFitnessPal.

== Medical imaging ==
HealthVault supported storage, viewing, uploading, and downloading, by consumers and third parties, of DICOM based medical imaging. Additionally, a plethora of third party HealthVault medical imaging viewers had been released to connect to HealthVault.

== Interoperability ==
HealthVault supported a number of exchange formats, including industry standards such as the Continuity of Care Document and the Continuity of Care Record. Support for industry standards made it possible to integrate with many personal health record solutions.

== See also ==
- Fitbit – Series of activity tracker devices by Google
- Health (Apple) – Health informatics mobile app
