= WHO SMART guidelines =

WHO framework for health guidelines

The WHO Smart Guidelines is a framework developed by the World Health Organization (WHO) to streamline the implementation of evidence-based health recommendations using digital technologies. The acronym "SMART" stands for Standards-based, Machine-readable, Adaptive, Requirements-based, and Testable, which outlines the structured approach used to translate traditional health guidelines into formats suitable for digital health systems.: The objective of SMART guidelines is to promote adaptation of WHO guidelines while preserving fidelity of the evidence.

== Background ==
The WHO publishes numerous health guidelines that aim to improve healthcare delivery across different countries, especially in low- and middle-income countries (LMICs). However, the adoption of these guidelines has been hindered by several challenges. Some key issues include difficulties in adapting global recommendations to local contexts, limited experience with integrating guidelines into digital health systems, and insufficient healthcare infrastructure. These obstacles have led to delays in the adoption of WHO guidelines by national health systems, sometimes taking several years to implement.

WHO SMART Guidelines attempt to address these issues by providing a transparent, and testable systematic pathway for countries to work through. Based on this approach, "Digital Adaptation Kits" that translate WHO guidelines into a common language that helps implementation. They are software-neutral, meaning they can be adapted into whichever software platform a country has elected to use, encouraging adoption.

== Components ==
The SMART guidelines framework is composed of five key layers, which systematically transition guidelines from traditional, human-readable formats to executable, machine-readable algorithms:

SMART guideline layers
| Layer | Content Type | Description |
|---|---|---|
| L1 | Narrative | Evidence-based recommendations in descriptive format primarily intended for human readability |
| L2 | Operational | Software-neutral documentation of requirements. |
| L3 | Machine-readable | Structured software-neutral specifications with coding, terminology and interoperability standards |
| L4 | Executable | Software that deliver the requirements through execution of static algorithms |
| L5 | Dynamic | Executable dynamic algorithms that are optimized with advanced analytics and training. |

== Barriers to adoption ==
While the Smart Guidelines have been piloted in several countries with positive initial outcomes, there are significant challenges to their widespread adoption. A 2022 scoping review highlighted several barriers including

- Weak national legislation and policy coherence
- Inadequate expertise and training of healthcare providers
- Funding limitations for guideline implementation
- Poor healthcare infrastructure in many LMICs

Additionally, governance issues within member states have compounded these challenges, with a lack of accountability and transparency mechanisms further hindering the uptake of WHO guidelines. In some cases, WHO guidelines were considered technically unclear or difficult to implement, particularly for certain health conditions.

To mitigate these issues, WHO has emphasized the need for global and local investments in capacity building, particularly in the areas of digital health expertise and infrastructure development. The use of the HL7 FHIR standard in the Smart Guidelines has also been a point of debate, as some argue that the scarcity of trained professionals in LMICs could initially limit its adoption. However, proponents note that the widespread adoption of global standards like FHIR can ultimately benefit all countries by encouraging shared investments and resources.

== Other global initiatives ==
The WHO Smart Guidelines are part of a broader global trend of digitizing clinical guidelines to make them more actionable in healthcare systems. For example, the Centers for Disease Control and Prevention (CDC) in the United States developed the "Adapting Clinical Guidelines for the Digital Age" (ACG) initiative, which promotes a holistic approach to digital health guideline implementation. The CDC approach includes a 12-phase process for creating and implementing both written and computable guidelines. While the CDC's initiative took a comprehensive approach, the WHO initially focused its Smart Guidelines on specific domains, such as antenatal care, before expanding to other health areas.

The WHO's top-down approach, which involves transitioning global narrative guidelines to digital formats and then adapting them locally, contrasts with the more decentralized, middle-out approaches seen in other contexts. Some experts have suggested that including a SMART Guidelines statement on all current WHO guidelines might help broaden their adoption by promoting long-term alignment with the global digital health community.
