= MLM =

MLM or mlm may refer to:

== Organizations ==
- Multi-level marketing
- The NYSE stock symbol of Martin Marietta Materials
- Military liaison missions of the victors of World War II
- Missouri Lumber and Mining Company

== Science and technology ==
- Medical logic module, of a healthcare knowledge base
- Millilumen (mlm), a unit of luminous flux
- Multi-layer mask, in multi-project wafer service in semiconductor fabrication
- Multipurpose Laboratory Module or Nauka, a Russian module of the International Space Station.

== Transportation ==
- Morelia International Airport's IATA airport code
- Millom railway station, England (station code)

== Other uses ==
- Marxism–Leninism–Maoism, a communist political philosophy
- Man loving men
