= Medical algorithm =

Concept in medical informatics

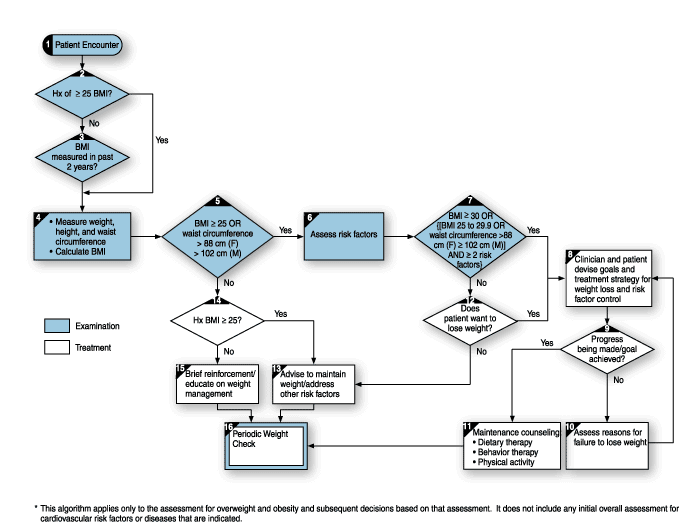
A medical algorithm for assessment and treatment of overweight and obesity.

A medical algorithm is any computation, formula, statistical survey, nomogram, or look-up table, useful in healthcare. Medical algorithms include decision tree approaches to healthcare treatment (e.g., if symptoms A, B, and C are evident, then use treatment X) and also less clear-cut tools aimed at reducing or defining uncertainty. A medical prescription is also a type of medical algorithm.

== Scope ==
Medical algorithms are part of a broader field which is usually fit under the aims of medical informatics and medical decision-making. Medical decisions occur in several areas of medical activity including medical test selection, diagnosis, therapy and prognosis, and automatic control of medical equipment.

In relation to logic-based and artificial neural network-based clinical decision support systems, which are also computer applications used in the medical decision-making field, algorithms are less complex in architecture, data structure and user interface. Medical algorithms are not necessarily implemented using digital computers. In fact, many of them can be represented on paper, in the form of diagrams, nomographs, etc.

== Examples ==
A wealth of medical information exists in the form of published medical algorithms. These algorithms range from simple calculations to complex outcome predictions. Most clinicians use only a small subset routinely.

Examples of medical algorithms are:

- Calculators, e.g. an on-line or stand-alone calculator for body mass index (BMI) when stature and body weight are given;
- Flowcharts and drakon-charts, e.g. a binary decision tree for deciding what is the etiology of chest pain
- Look-up tables, e.g. for looking up food energy and nutritional contents of foodstuffs
- Nomograms, e.g. a moving circular slide to calculate body surface area or drug dosages.

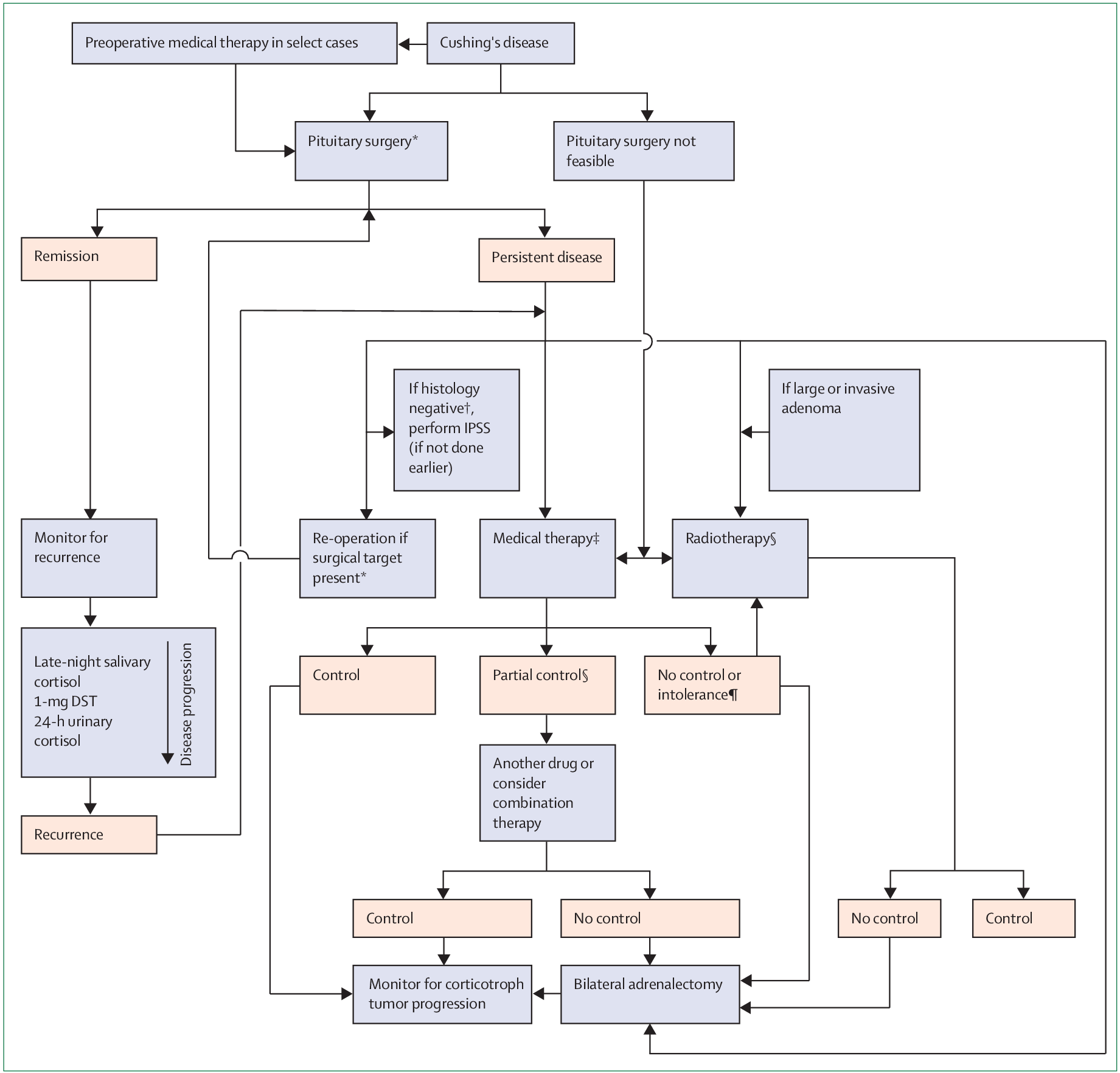
Example of a flowchart indicating the management algorithm of Cushing's disease.

A common class of algorithms are embedded in guidelines on the choice of treatments produced by many national, state, financial and local healthcare organizations and provided as knowledge resources for day to day use and for induction of new physicians. A field which has gained particular attention is the choice of medications for psychiatric conditions. In the United Kingdom, guidelines or algorithms for this have been produced by most of the circa 500 primary care trusts, substantially all of the circa 100 secondary care psychiatric units and many of the circa 10 000 general practices. In the US, there is a national (federal) initiative to provide them for all states, and by 2005 six states were adapting the approach of the Texas Medication Algorithm Project or otherwise working on their production.

A grammar—the Arden syntax—exists for describing algorithms in terms of medical logic modules. An approach such as this should allow exchange of MLMs between doctors and establishments, and enrichment of the common stock of tools.

== Purpose ==
The intended purpose of medical algorithms is to improve and standardize decisions made in the delivery of medical care. Medical algorithms assist in standardizing selection and application of treatment regimens, with algorithm automation intended to reduce potential introduction of errors. Some attempt to predict the outcome, for example critical care scoring systems.

Artificial intelligence monitors vast amounts of data and provides insight into the newest heath information. With the capability to simultaneously digest various informational sources, decision support systems provide a broadened stance point when suggesting decision options to users.

Computerized health diagnostics algorithms can provide timely clinical decision support, improve adinherence to evidence-based guidelines, and be a resource for education and research.

Medical algorithms based on best practice can assist everyone involved in delivery of standardized treatment. Many algorithms are presented as protocols and comprise key content of medical education.

== Medical Algorithms and Algorithmic Bias ==
Racial and ethnic minority groups, along with low income populations, face unequal access to information technology. For example, in attempts to utilize statistical prediction tools, there has been an underestimation of care needed for Black individuals due to the lack of access to health care for this minority group. Controlling data analysis through human implementation can decrease the algorithm tendency of generalizability.

Social determinants of health have impacted disadvantaged communities leading to bias algorithms. There is an effect on racial and ethnic disparity regardless of its implementation as variables. Due to variability in outcomes, implementation of different clinical conditions, algorithms, and outcomes are needed to advance future algorithms.

Access to health care in regard to location is also important to consider. There can be differences in resource and transportation availability that may affect findings that are supposed to be representative of the general public. Screening rates may differ in populations located in urban areas compared to rural areas. A reason for this, for example, lays in there being no guarantee that these technologies can be functional in rural areas where electricity, internet, reception, and air conditioning may hinder access. Health disparities can be from discrimination of the nonbiological factor of race and the lack of proper representation of all populations. There is the need for approaching evidence to unite various life experiences while considering how those different backgrounds have affected health outcomes for certain populations.

Equity approaches are important in the construction and maintenance of these algorithms. The implementation of diverse stakeholders invites multiple perspectives that can detect and ensure the production of accurate and representative data throughout the development of algorithms.

With these incorporations, these medical algorithms can further contribute to its purpose of standardize decisions within medical practice.

== Credibility for Medical Algorithms ==
Descriptive accuracy are simpler to understand where predications are made from. Relevancy depends on the context of the reader and application of information where it can make predictive for physicians, or descriptive accuracy for the general public, the priority.

Reproducibility would enable credibility where federated learning is being utilized. There is no sharing of data but there is still collaborations due to the risks of privacy leakage.

Being transparent in how data was utilized, its purpose, and if there is any bias should be communicated and openly available to all users to improve error detection and trust with the public.

== Cautions ==
In common with most science and medicine, algorithms whose contents are not wholly available for scrutiny and open to improvement should be regarded with suspicion.

There is a lack of data due to the current technology capacity that may have led to incorrect predictions. Mistakes in predictions may also be caused by bias and prejudice within data utilized to train medical algorithms.

There can be bias in the data training artificial intelligence. If there is no pathophysiologic association to demographic or socioeconomic factor, then they should be excluded to avoid issues with bias and prejudice.

There is privacy implications from physicians utilizing public chatbots from risk of leaking sensitive patient information. This has led to patient concerns of data being resold and lack of privacy protections.

Despite the difficulties faced from utilizing artificial intelligence in medical application, the idea of austerity, where there high demand and lack of resources, have led to the pressure of digitizing data for increased efficiency.

With ethical concerns regarding privacy and transparency of how patient information is being shared, these technologies could be held accountable with the collaboration of physicians. This may also redirect clinician's attention and expertise further into aspects that computers lack.

Computations obtained from medical algorithms should be compared with, and tempered by, clinical knowledge and physician judgment.

== See also ==
- Artificial intelligence in healthcare
- Medical guideline
- Odds algorithm
