= Consolidated Clinical Document Architecture =

XML standard for clinical documents

Consolidated Clinical Document Architecture (C-CDA)
- Abbreviation: C-CDA
- Status: Published
- First published: December 2011
- Latest version: 2.1; 2015
- Organization: Health Level Seven International
- Committee: Structured Documents Group
- Base standards: XML; CDA; HL7 RIM
- Related standards: CCD
- Domain: Electronic health records
- Website: C-CDA® Release 2.1

The HL7 Consolidated Clinical Document Architecture (C-CDA) is an XML-based markup standard which provides a library of CDA formatted documents. Clinical documents using the C-CDA standards are exchanged billions of times annually in the United States. All certified Electronic health records in the United States are required to export medical data using the C-CDA standard. While the standard was developed primarily for the United States as the C-CDA incorporates references to terminologies and value set required by US regulation, it has also been used internationally.

== Content ==
There are 11 document types in the C-CDA standard

- Care Plan - A Care Plan (including Home Health Plan of Care (HHPoC)) is a consensus-driven dynamic plan that represents a patient's and Care Team Members' prioritized concerns, goals, and planned interventions. It represents an instance of this dynamic Care Plan at a point in time.
- Consultation Note - The Consultation Note is generated by a request from a clinician for an opinion or advice from another clinician.
- Continuity of Care Document - The Continuity of Care Document (CCD) represents a core data set of the most relevant administrative, demographic, and clinical information facts about a patient's healthcare, covering one or more healthcare encounters. The primary use case for the CCD is to provide a snapshot in time containing the germane clinical, demographic, and administrative data for a specific patient.
- Diagnostic Imaging Report - A Diagnostic Imaging Report (DIR) is a document that contains a consulting specialist's interpretation of image data.
- Discharge Summary - The Discharge Summary is a document which synopsizes a patient's admission to a hospital, LTPAC provider, or other setting. It provides information for the continuation of care following discharge.
- History and Physical - A History and Physical (H&P) note is a medical report that documents the current and past conditions of the patient.
- Operative Note - The Operative Note is created immediately following a surgical or other high-risk procedure. It records the pre- and post-surgical diagnosis, pertinent events of the procedure, as well as the condition of the patient following the procedure.
- Procedure Note - Procedure Notes are differentiated from Operative Notes because they do not involve incision or excision as the primary act.The Procedure Note is created immediately following a non-operative procedure.
- Progress Note - This template represents a patient's clinical status during a hospitalization, outpatient visit, treatment with a LTPAC provider, or other healthcare encounter.
- Transfer Summary - The Transfer Summary standardizes critical information for exchange of information between providers of care when a patient moves between health care settings.
- Unstructured Document - An Unstructured Document (UD) document type can include unstructured content, such as a graphic, directly in a text element with a mediaType attribute, or reference a single document file, such as a word-processing document using a text/reference element.
