= Gello Expression Language =

The GELLO Expression Language was started in 2001 and introduced in 2002; in 2005, GELLO was adopted as an international standard by Health Level Seven International and ANSI for a decision support language. GELLO Release 2 was completed and approved by ANSI in June 2010. The GELLO specifications have been developed in coordination with the HL7 Clinical Decision Support TC (CDSTC). As of 2021, the GELLO Implementation Guide DSTU was withdrawn from HL7 Version 3 due to inactivity. However, Release 2 of the standard remains as is, despite a low level of use.

GELLO is a class-based object-oriented programming language and a relative of the Object Constraint Language (OCL). OCL is a well-developed constraint language that makes it attractive for use as an expression language. The intention was for GELLO to evolve as a standard query and expression language for decision support.

GELLO creates the potential for many decision support options, as the full array of atomic patient data is greatly accessible to complement better, safer clinical decision-making by health professionals. Furthermore, this enables specialist clinicians to customize their current systems and create flexible purpose built decision support systems.

Standardization of GELLO has made this language compatible with the HL7 version 3.0 Reference Information Model (RIM). GELLO uses an abstract "virtual medical record" (vMR) so that the same GELLO code can run on multiple systems accessing data stored in different formats. The vMR is a simplified view of the HL7 RIM.

The 2019 focus of the HL7 CDS WG was to build the Clinical Quality Language (CQL), version 1.5 of which was later published in 2020.

== Uses for GELLO ==
The GELLO language can be used to:

- Build up queries to extract and manipulate data from medical records.
- Construct decision criteria by building up expressions to reason about particular data features/values. These criteria can be used in decision-support knowledge bases such as those designed to provide alerts and reminders, guidelines, or other decision rules.
- Create expressions, formulae, and queries for other applications.
- GELLO was used with Guideline Interchange Format (GLIF), as it is the most expressive expression language in the context of GLIF.

== See also ==
- Medical guideline
- Clinical Document Architecture
- Clinical decision support system
