= HL7 International =

Organization involved in healthcare informatics interoperability standards

Health Level Seven International
- Abbreviation: HL7
- Formation: 1987
- Legal status: Non-profit
- Headquarters: Ann Arbor, Michigan
- Website: hl7.org

Health Level Seven (HL7) International Inc. is a standards organization that develops technical standards for health data exchange. The HL7 series of standards are its best known, of which the 2.x are the most commonly used in the healthcare sector. It is accredited by ANSI.

== History ==
Logo as of 2004

The HL7 community is a global organization (Health Level Seven International, Inc.) with country-specific affiliate organizations. Health Level Seven International, Inc. is headquartered in Ann Arbor, Michigan. HL7 affiliate organizations, not-for-profit organizations incorporated in local jurisdictions, exist in over 30 countries. The first affiliate organization was created in Germany in 1993.

HL7 was founded in 1987 to produce a standard for the exchange of data with hospital information systems. Donald W. Simborg, the CEO of Simborg Systems took the initiative to create the HL7 organization with the aim to allow for wider use of its own exchange protocol (known as the StatLAN protocol, originally defined at the University of California, San Francisco in the late 1970s). Membership initially consisted of those that had already implemented the StatLAN protocol. The name "Health Level-7" is a reference to the seventh layer of the ISO OSI Reference model also known as the application layer. The name indicates that HL7 focuses on application layer protocols for the health care domain, independent of lower layers. HL7 effectively considers all lower layers merely as tools.

HL7 is one of several American National Standards Institute (ANSI) accredited Standards Developing Organizations (SDOs) operating in the healthcare arena. Most of these SDOs produce standards (sometimes called specifications or protocols) for a particular healthcare domain such as pharmacy, medical devices, imaging or insurance (claims processing) transactions. Health Level Seven's domain is clinical and administrative data.

HL7 has been adopted by ISO. The first mutually published standard is ISO/HL7 21731:2006 Health informatics—HL7 version 3—Reference information model—Release 1.

== Standards ==
HL7 International specifies a number of flexible standards, guidelines, and methodologies by which various healthcare systems can communicate with each other. Such guidelines or data standards are a set of rules that allow information to be shared and processed in a uniform and consistent manner. These data standards are meant to allow healthcare organizations to easily share clinical information. Theoretically, this ability to exchange information should help to minimize the tendency for medical care to be geographically isolated and highly variable.

HL7 International considers the following standards to be its primary standards – those standards that are most commonly used and implemented:

- Version 2.x Messaging Standard – an interoperability specification for health and medical transactions
- Version 3 Messaging Standard – an interoperability specification for health and medical transactions
- Clinical Document Architecture (CDA) – an exchange model for clinical documents, based on HL7 Version 3
- Continuity of Care Document (CCD) – a US specification for the exchange of medical summaries, based on CDA.
- Structured Product Labeling (SPL) – the published information that accompanies a medicine, based on HL7 Version 3
- Clinical Context Object Workgroup (CCOW) – an interoperability specification for the visual integration of user applications

Other HL7 standards/methodologies include:

- Fast Healthcare Interoperability Resources (FHIR) – a standard for the exchange of resources
- Arden Syntax – a grammar for representing medical conditions and recommendations as a Medical Logic Module (MLM)
- Claims Attachments – a Standard Healthcare Attachment to augment another healthcare transaction
- Functional Models of Electronic Health Record (EHR) / Personal Health Record (PHR) systems – a standardized description of health and medical functions sought for or available in such software applications
- GELLO – a standard expression language used for clinical decision support

== See also ==
- CDISC
- DICOM
- Electronic medical record
- eHealth
- European Institute for Health Records (European Union)
- Fast Healthcare Interoperability Resources
- Health Informatics
- Integrating the Healthcare Enterprise (IHE)
- ISO TC 215
- openEHR Foundation
