= Microsoft Band 2 =

Smartwatch by Microsoft

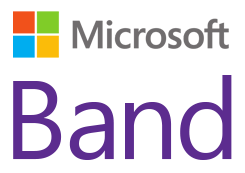

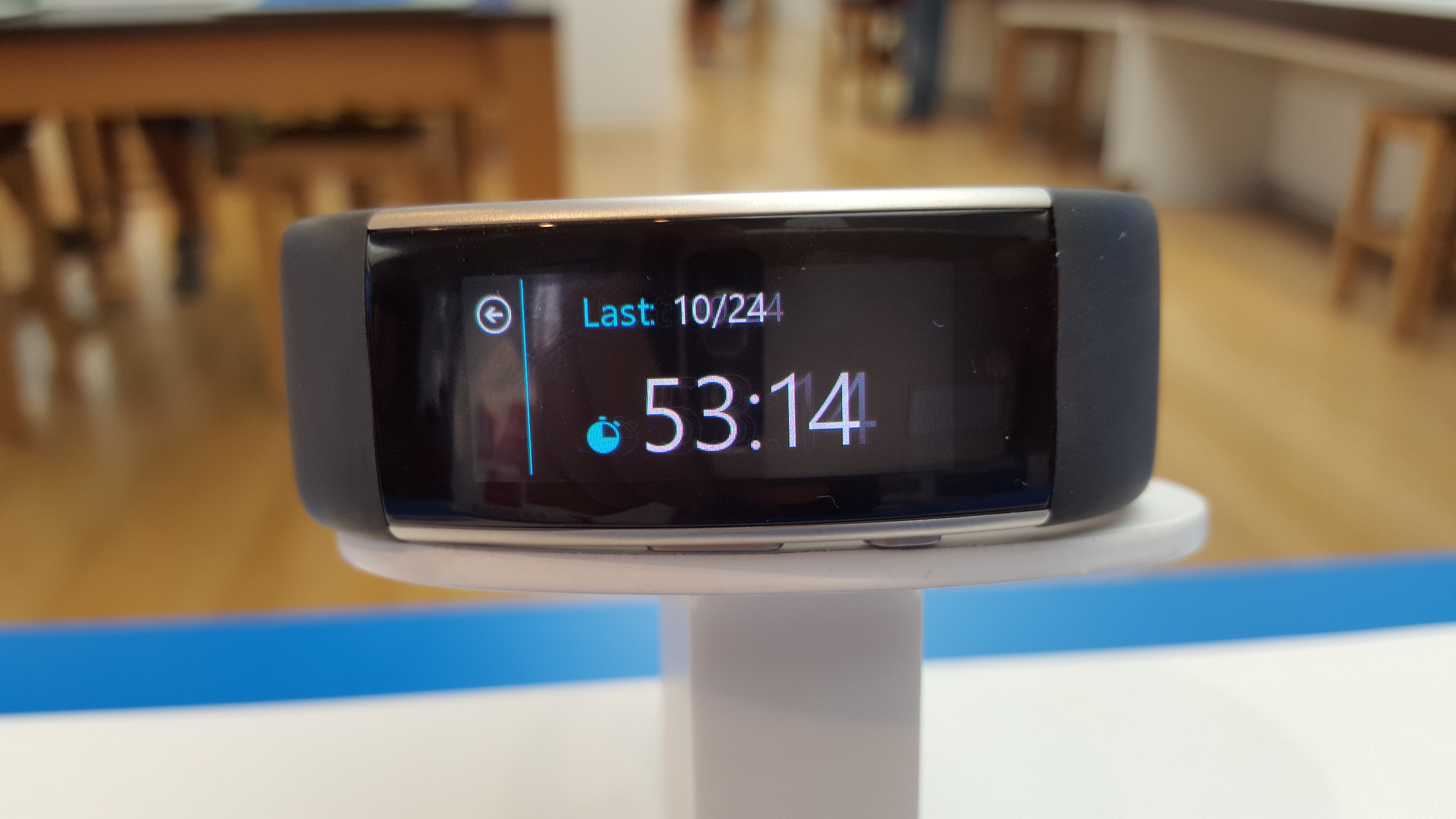
- Manufacturer: Microsoft
- Type: Smart band (with smartwatch features)
- Released: October 30, 2015
- Introductory price: $250 (USA) $330 (Canada) £200 (UK) $379 (Australia)
- Display: Capacitive AMOLED display 1.26 x 0.50 in (32 x 12.8 mm); 320 x 128 pixels
- Connectivity: Bluetooth 4.0
- Power: Li-Polymer battery
- Backward compatibility: Windows Phone 8.1 Update 2, Windows 10 Mobile, iOS 8.1, Android 4.4 or later connected via Bluetooth
- Predecessor: Microsoft Band

Microsoft Band 2 was the second-generation smart band with smartwatch features developed by Microsoft. Announced on October 6, 2015, it succeeded the original Microsoft Band and was initially available in the United States, United Kingdom and Canada. It was later also available in Australia through the Sydney flagship store, Microsoft online store, and selected retailers such as JB Hi-Fi and Harvey Norman. Like its predecessor, it incorporates fitness tracking and is compatible with Windows, iOS and Android smartphones via a Bluetooth connection. On October 3, 2016, it was discontinued. On May 31, 2019, the Band's companion app stopped working and Microsoft offered refunds for customers who were still active platform users.

== Technology ==
The Microsoft Band 2 includes multiple sensors:

- Optical heart rate monitor
- Three-axis accelerometer
- Gyrometer
- GPS
- Microphone
- Ambient light sensor
- Galvanic skin response sensors
- UV sensor
- Skin temperature sensor
- Capacitive sensor
- Barometer

Although the Microsoft Band 2 is primarily designed for use with activities related to fitness, it also provides extensive smartwatch-like features such as sleep tracking, communication tools, as well as many standard features found on a digital wrist watch.

=== Sleep tracking ===
The Band 2 uses its sensors to track sleep patterns when it is worn to bed. It can advise whether the user woke during the night, and provide information about sleep quality and duration.

=== Communication tools ===
When paired with a smartphone, the Band 2 can exchange information with the smartphone. This allows the Band 2 to show:

- Alerts and previews of incoming messages sent via SMS to the smartphone
- Alerts and previews of emails downloaded by the smartphone
- Alerts from the notification centre of the smartphone (Windows Phone)
- Call log of missed calls

=== Watch ===
The Microsoft Band 2 can be used as a replacement for a normal digital wrist watch. It includes the following standard time features:

- Time (12- or 24-hour),
- Date (day of month and day of week)
- Timer feature
- Stop watch with lap timer
- Alarm

== Criticism ==
=== Mobile operating systems ===
Certain functions of the Microsoft Band 2, such as the ability to reply to text messages using Cortana, are only available when paired with phones running a Microsoft mobile OS. Android users can reply with a set of predefined messages while iOS users cannot reply at all.

Additionally, there are certain sync issues—most notably inaccuracies in the weather tile. Some have made efforts to rectify the situation using Microsoft's Web Tiles.

There are issues when using the Band with Windows 10 Mobile.

=== Durability ===
There have been several reports that the plastic elastomer band material will fail after minimal use. Users describe cracks developing in the band, which required device replacement by Microsoft. Microsoft will not make the strap slightly thicker, and has decided to discontinue the line.
