= Microsoft Band =

Smartwatch by Microsoft

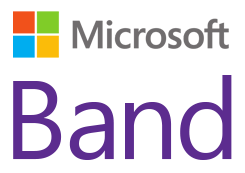

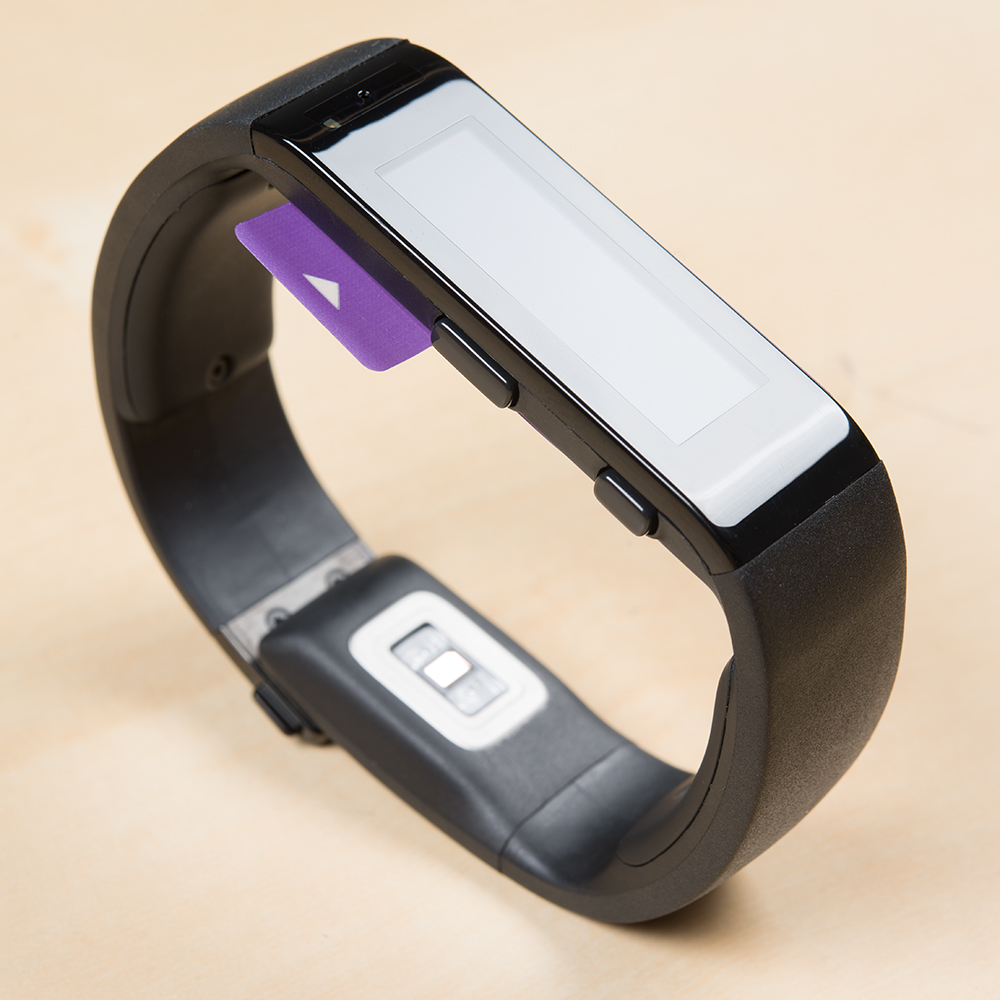
- Manufacturer: Microsoft
- Type: Smart band (with smartwatch, and activity tracker/fitness tracker features)
- Released: October 30, 2014 (USA); April 15, 2015 (UK)
- Introductory price: $199 (USA) £169.99 (UK)
- Discontinued: October 4, 2016
- System on a chip: Freescale Kinetis K24 @120mhz
- Memory: 2MB of Static RAM
- Storage: 64MB of non-volatile flash storage
- Display: Capacitive 1.4" TFT full color display
- Graphics: 320×106 pixels, 245 PPI
- Connectivity: Bluetooth 4.0
- Backward compatibility: Windows Phone 8.1, iOS 7.1 or later, Android 4.3 or later connected via Bluetooth.
- Successor: Microsoft Band 2
- Website: www.microsoft.com/en-us/band

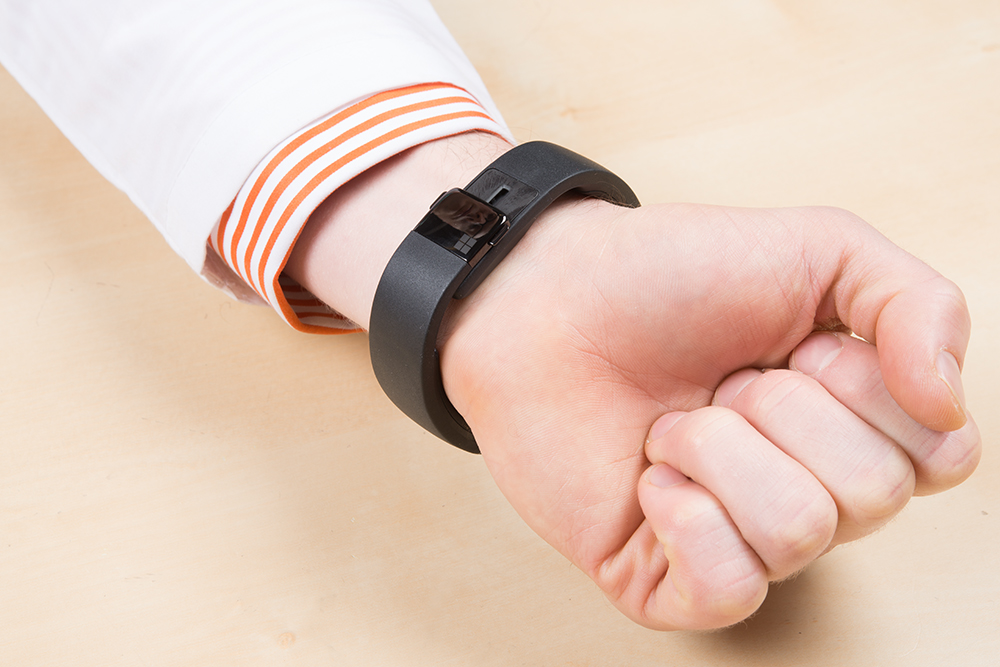
Microsoft Band's clasp

Microsoft Band is a discontinued smart band with smartwatch and activity tracker/fitness tracker features, created and developed by Microsoft. It was announced on October 29, 2014. The Microsoft Band incorporates fitness tracking and health-oriented capabilities and integrated with Windows Phone, iOS, and Android smartphones through a Bluetooth connection. On October 3, 2016, Microsoft stopped sales and development of the line of devices. On May 31, 2019, the Band's companion app was decommissioned, and Microsoft offered a refund for customers who were lifelong active platform users.

== History ==
The Microsoft Band was announced by Microsoft on October 29, 2014 and released in limited quantities in the United States the following day. The Band was initially sold exclusively on the Microsoft Store's website and retail locations; due to its unexpected popularity, it sold out on the first day it was released and was in short supply over the 2014 holiday shopping season.

Production was ramped up in March 2015 to increase availability, several months after the release of Android Wear but ahead of the Apple Watch. Availability was expanded in the U.S. to include retailers Amazon, Best Buy, and Target. On April 15, 2015, the Microsoft Band was released in the UK priced at £169.99 and available for purchase through the Microsoft Store, or from select partners.

== Features ==
The Microsoft band incorporates ten sensors, though only eight were documented on Microsoft's product page:

1. Optical heart rate monitor
2. Three-axis accelerometer
3. Gyrometer
4. GPS
5. Microphone
6. Ambient light sensor
7. Galvanic skin response sensors
8. UV sensor
9. Skin temperature sensor
10. Capacitive sensor

The Band's battery was designed to run for two days on a full charge, and the device partially relies on its companion app Microsoft Health, which was available for operating systems beginning with Windows Phone 8.1, Android 4.3+, and iOS 7.1+, if Bluetooth was available.

Despite being designed as a fitness tracker, the Band has numerous smartwatch-like features, such as built in apps (called tiles) like Exercise, UV, Alarm & Timer, Calls, Messages, Calendar, Facebook, Weather and more.

The Band worked with any Windows Phone 8.1 device. If paired with a device running Windows Phone 8.1 Update 1, Cortana might also be available, although some features still require direct use of the paired phone. This Update 1 was included with the Lumia Denim firmware for Microsoft Lumia phones. Users can view their latest notifications on their phone by using the Notifications Center Tile.

The device functioned as a way to promote Microsoft software and license it to developers and OEMs.

== See also ==
- Smart Personal Objects Technology
- Apple Watch
- Android Wear
- Microsoft Band 2
- Pebble
- Fitbit
- Garmin
