= Context management =

Context management is a dynamic computer process that uses 'subjects' of data in one application, to point to data resident in a separate application also containing the same subject.

Context management allows users to choose a subject once in one application, and have all other applications containing information on that same subject 'tune' to the data they contain, thus eliminating the need to redundantly select the subject in the varying applications.

An example from the healthcare industry where Context Management is widely used, multiple applications operating "in context" through use of a context manager would allow a user to select a patient (i.e., the subject) in one application and when the user enters the other application, that patient's information is already pre-fetched and presented, obviating the need to re-select the patient in the second application. The further the user 'drills' into the application (e.g., test, result, diagnosis, etc.) all context aware applications continue to drill-down into the data, in context with the user's requests.

Context management is gaining in prominence in healthcare due to the creation of the Clinical Context Object Workgroup standard committee (CCOW) which has created a standardized protocol enabling applications to function in a 'context aware' state.

Context management is gaining in the Business Rule market as well. Knowing the context of any information exchange is critical. For example, a seller may need to know such things as: is this shipment urgent, is this a preferred customer, do they need English or Spanish, what model is the part for? Without context, mistakes and run-on costs rapidly ensue.

In automating information integration, knowing and defining context of use is the single most pervasive and important factor. This context mechanism is at the heart of allowing users to quantify what their context factors are precisely, this removes the guesswork from business transaction exchanges between business transaction information management partners and allows them to formalize their collaboration agreements exactly.
