= Arden2ByteCode =

- Original author(s): Peter L. Reichertz Institute for Medical Informatics
- Developer(s): Peter L. Reichertz Institute for Medical Informatics
- Initial release: 12 September 2011; 13 years ago
- Stable release: v0.7.0 / 2 December 2016; 8 years ago
- Repository: github.com/PLRI/arden2bytecode
- Written in: Java
- Operating system: BSD, Linux, Mac OS and Microsoft Windows
- Platform: Java (software platform)
- Size: 3.2 MB
- Standard(s): HL7 International Arden Syntax for Medical Logic Modules (MLMs)
- Type: compiler
- License: GNU General Public License, BSD Licence
- Website: plri.github.io/arden2bytecode

Arden2ByteCode is a libreware compiler for the Arden Syntax markup language. The compiler translates HL7 International Arden Syntax for Medical Logic Modules (MLMs) to Java Bytecode. The Arden Syntax is a standardized language that can be used to express medical knowledge. Arden2ByteCode runs on the Java Virtual Machine and can be used on a wide variety of platforms.

Arden2ByteCode is accompanied by Arden4Eclipse a plugin for the eclipse framework that allows easy development of medical logic modules.

== History ==
Arden2ByteCode was developed as a part or the Lower Saxony research network "Design of Environments for Ageing" (GAL). The GAL network was supported by the Lower Saxony Ministry of Science and Culture through the "Niedersächsisches Vorab" grant programme (grant ZN 2701). Most of the initial development was done in 2011 by Daniel Grunwald. After he left the project the work was continued by Hannes Flicka, Mike Klimek and others. Initially the compiler supported a subset of the standard version 2.5.

== Current status ==
As of 2016 most of version 2.5 is supported. Still missing are the include statement and the until-trigger.

To test the standard compliance a JUnit-based test framework has been developed and can be used to test other compilers as well.
