= Treatment decision support =

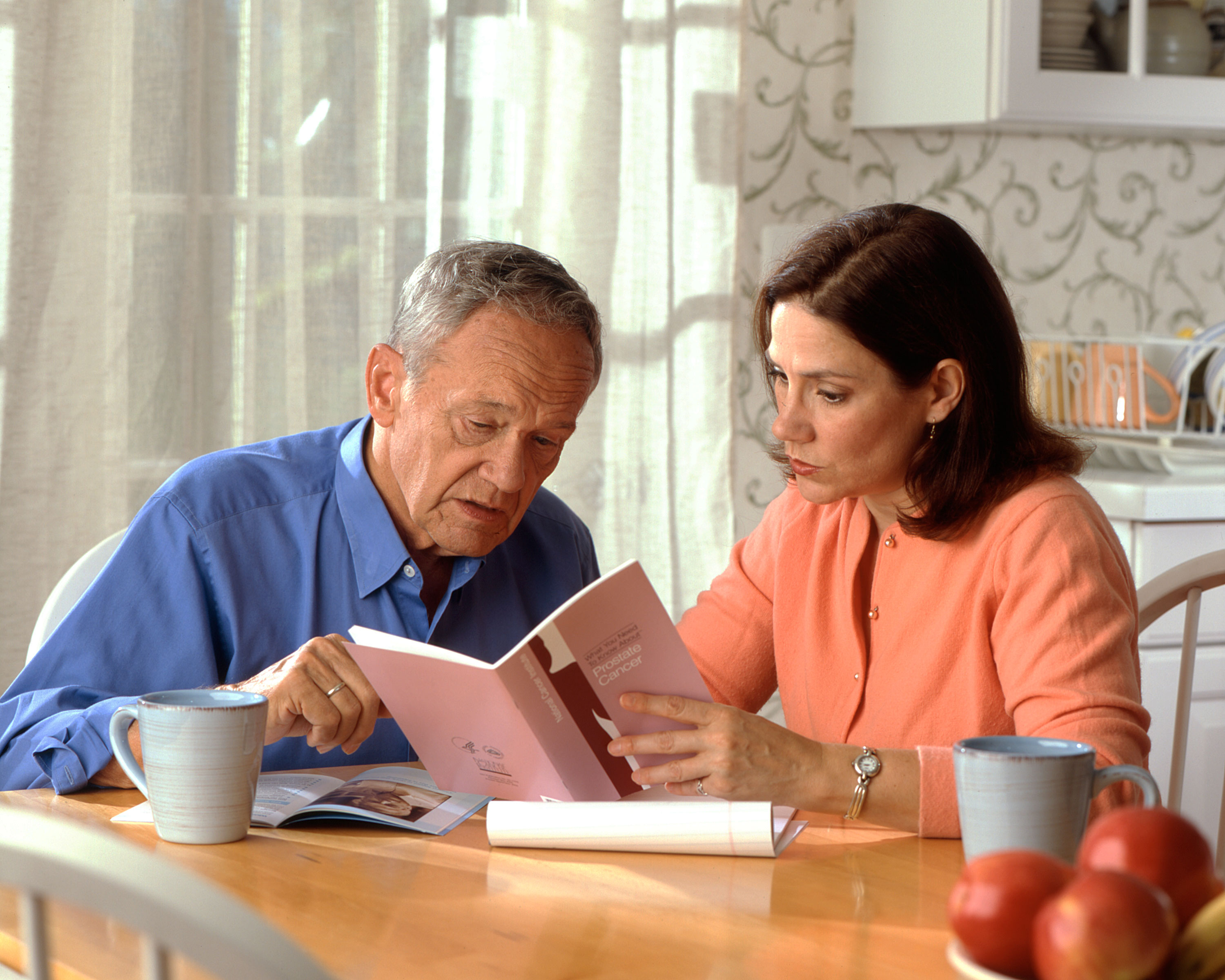
In this image from the National Cancer Institute, a family reviews decision support information regarding potential cancer treatments.

Treatment decision support consists of the tools and processes used to enhance medical patients’ healthcare decision-making. The term differs from clinical decision support, in that clinical decision support tools are aimed at medical professionals, while treatment decision support tools empower the people who will receive the treatments. This service may be delivered at the site of healthcare services, or as an employee benefit through third-party providers.

== Overview ==
Patients are often unaware of the benefits, side-effects, costs, or other key factors about a healthcare treatment that may inform their decision. For example, a cancer patient may face a decision whether to pursue aggressive chemotherapy to prolong life versus more palliative therapy to increase quality of life. An orthopedics patient may face a choice between aggressive lumbar spinal fusion versus physical therapy. Treatment decision support is intended to bridge the gap between patients' initial knowledge and the knowledge that is required for them to make fully informed decisions about which treatment to pursue.

Treatment decision support programs allow patients to actively engage in the healthcare decision-making process by gathering and weighing information which may be personalized for their situation. For example, some disease-specific programs may offer series of surveys that help a patient determine their treatment preferences, however these services have been criticized as supporting only a small portion of patients who fit the questions. Other treatment decision support programs include the ability to discuss treatment options with a skilled physician who is not treating the patient and is not subject to cost pressures.

== Studies ==
Studies have shown that patient-oriented evidence-based decision support systems can improve decision quality for patients, thus improving the fit between treatment and patient preference. Other studies have reported increases in patient satisfaction and health following treatment decision support programs. These systems can also reduce healthcare system spending by initially aligning patient preferences with treatment (avoiding redundant treatments) and giving patients tools to express desires for less aggressive treatment modalities that often improve quality of life. Treatment decision support may also improve adherence and compliance.

== Forms and providers ==
Tools may include literature, interactive online exercises, programs that encourage speaking with similarly-situated patients, discussions with neutral physicians, and other programs.

Treatment decision support may be provided by integrated health plans (e.g., Kaiser), insurers/TPAs (e.g., Optum), or independent vendors (e.g., Grand Rounds).

== See also ==
- Clinical decision support
