= Public Health Information Network =

The Public Health Information Network (PHIN) is a US national initiative, developed by the Centers for Disease Control and Prevention (CDC), for advancing fully capable and interoperable information systems in public health organizations. The initiative involves establishing and implementing a framework for public health information systems.

== Overview ==
PHIN is designed to do the following:

- Enable the consistent exchange of health data
- Protect the security of the health data exchanged
- Ensure that the network will be available at all times

=== Structure ===
The five functional areas of PHIN:

1. Detection and Monitoring
2. Data Analysis
3. Knowledge Management
4. Alerting
5. Response

== PHIN's impact on public health ==
PHIN attempts to provide the public health sector with continuous access to necessary health care information. Access to near real-time data attempts to improve community-based interventions that are implemented as a result of terrorism or disease outbreaks.

PHIN provides support and helps improve the outcomes of various public health programs including the following:

- The U.S. Department of Health and Human Services
  - Desired outcome: improving public health information systems.
- The Secretary of the U.S. Department of Health and Human Services
  - Supports: Terrorism Defense, Healthcare Delivery Improvement, and IT Enhancements.
- Healthy People 2010
  - Supports: Focus area 23 - ensure that public health agencies have the adequate infrastructure to effectively provide essential public health services.
- Partners in public health
  - Desired outcome: "Roadmap" for establishing national capacity for public health systems.
  - Health is a most important component of a successful life. Health and fitness divide into three aspects physical health, mental health, and social health. Symptoms of a healthy life are taking a good and healthy diet, having a peaceful sleep, having a strong immune system that can beat diseases, having an extraordinarily creative mind, and having good cooperative behavior in a social circle. A healthy and peaceful life needs exercise, walking, vitamins, and supplements.

== Budget and funding ==
PHIN first received funding in 2004 through the Department of Health and Human Services and the Centers for Disease Control and Prevention. Between 25% and 30% of the $849 million of funding received through the Public Health Response and Preparedness Cooperative Agreement was to be used to focus on improving public health preparedness in all 50 states, 4 metropolitan areas and 8 US territories. In 2004 the initiative of the program was to "ensure that all public health partners have, or at least will have, access to a system or systems to accomplish established preparedness functions." In 2005, additional finances were available to states through the terrorism cooperative agreement. This agreement will support the development of current and new systems, in state health and public health departments, which will meet the PHIN standards and specifications.

== Partnerships ==
In order to collect and assess information system requirements for PHIN, the CDC works with public health partners, some of which include:

- NACCHO - National Association of County and City Health Officials
- ASTHO - Association of State and Territorial Health Officials

With the assistance of these partners, PHIN can target the following functional areas regarding preparedness:

1. Early Event Detection
2. Outbreak Management
3. Connecting Laboratory Services
4. Partner Communications and Alerting
5. Countermeasure/Response Administration

== Governance ==
The approval of technical and data standards for PHIN is completed by two working groups in the CDC Information Council (CIC). The following organizations are represented on each working group by two members of its staff: Association of State and Territorial Health Officials (ASTHO), National Association of County and City Health Officials (NACCHO), and Centers for Disease Control and Prevention (CDC). By regulation the standards conform to Department of Health and Human Services (HHS) requirements and the Federal Health architecture.

CIC also ensures that the following standards are met:

- E-Gov activities, which includes all regulations contained in the Government Paperwork Elimination Act (GPEA) goals
- Consolidated Health Informatics (CHI) initiative
- Federal Geographic Data Committee standards required by Office of Management and Budget (OMB) Circular A-16
- Public Health line of business and Public Health Monitoring Sub-function of the Federal Enterprise Architecture Business Reference Model

== Preparedness ==
=== Early event detection ===
In the realm of preparedness, the PHIN has developed systems to promote early event detection. Information systems that connect health care providers to the PHIN allow for rapid reporting of cases that may lead to public health emergencies. These information systems include call reporting systems, web-based systems, and other electronic case reporting systems. The PHIN has set up technical requirements so that facilities can be equipped to participate in these rapid reporting systems. These requirements also ensure that facilities can protect patient privacy in their reports and ensure integration with outbreak management.

=== Outbreak management ===
Another component in preparedness, the PHIN has a division of outbreak management which allows public health agencies to be adequately prepared for true outbreaks. The outbreak management system is integrated with the early event detection systems to ensure rapid, smooth awareness of outbreaks. The CDC and PHIN currently employ an Outbreak Management System software application to effectively manage data related to outbreaks.

== Connecting laboratories ==
Another component of PHIN is connecting laboratories through a set of computer communication standards called HL7. This allows specimen receipts and laboratory results to be exchanged between health organizations and agencies. This is especially useful in times of a health outbreak or other disaster.

== Countermeasure and response administration ==
The PHIN also works to track and support the supply of vaccinations and as well as the administration of these tasks. As part of this functionality, the PHIN allows limited supplies of vaccines and other needed drugs to be allocated properly when they are in short supply. Some vaccines and drugs will be traceable to clinics and drug administrators. PHIN also supports response administration by allowing adverse events to be monitored and quarantined populations to be monitored if necessary.

== Standards and specifications ==
PHIN has a set of Vocabulary Standards and Specifications that:

1. Supports the development and deployment of standards-based public health information systems.
2. Seeks to promote the use of standards-based vocabulary.
3. Fosters the use and exchange of consistent information among public health collaborators.
4. Ensures that the vocabularies are aligned with PHIN and CHI standards.

== See also ==
- HL7
- LOINC
- Health Insurance Portability and Accountability Act
- AtHoc, Inc. Mass Notification and Emergency Communication Systems
