= Victorian Miniature Railway =

Overview
- Status: Operating
- Locale: 3643 Harmony Way, Harcourt, Victoria
- Coordinates: 36.9934°S 144.2571°E
- Stations: 1

Service
- Type: Ridable miniature railway
- Operator: Victorian Miniature Railway

History
- Opened: 2025

Technical
- Line length: 1.5 km (0.93 mi)
- Track length: 2.7 km (1.7 mi)
- Track gauge: 7 1/4 in (184 mm)
- Operating speed: Max 12 km/h

The Victorian Miniature Railway is a 7 1/4 in (184 mm) gauge rideable miniature railway located in Harcourt, Victoria.

It had its grand opening on 6 December 2025, 9 years after construction began in 2016.

The railway operates every Sunday, from 10 AM to 4 PM. Rides cost $5, with children 2 years and younger, and companion card holders riding free.
