= Medical logic module =

A medical logic module (MLM) is an independent unit in a healthcare knowledge base that represents the knowledge published on a requirement for treating a patient according to a single medical decision.

Possible usage is with an event monitor program in an intensive care ward or with hospital information system on occurrence of defined conditions. See Arden syntax reference for examples. Early introduction is given with monographs.

== Implementation ==
The Arden syntax has been defined as a grammar which could make MLMs swappable between various platforms. XML representation of Arden (ArdenML) can be transformed by Extensible Stylesheet Language Transformations (XSLTs) to other forms.

There is no reference stated for general implementation as a transfer method between different information systems.

== See also ==
- Health Level 7
