= Clinical data standards =

Clinical data standards are used to store and communicate information related to healthcare so that its meaning is unambiguous. They are used in clinical practice, in activity analysis and finding, and in research and development.

There are many existing and proposed standards and many bodies working in this field.

In addition to standards specific to the clinical domain health informatics relies on other standards that are lower in the communications stack, and on many standards from metrology.

== Clinical data standards and interoperability ==
Interoperability between disparate clinical information systems requires common data standards or mapping of every transaction.

However common data standards alone will not provide interoperability, and the other requirements are identified in "How Standards will Support Interoperability" from the Faculty of Clinical Informatics and "Interoperability is more than technology: The role of culture and leadership in joined-up care" from the King's Fund

== Barriers to development and use ==
Barriers to the widespread adoption of effective data standards include:

- inconsistency in and poor understanding of the concepts and language used in clinical practice, for example compared to those in chemistry or accounting
- rival systems of standards
- the cost of implementation or change to better standards
- avoidance of commercial competition.

== Existing and proposed clinical data standards ==
- Integrating the Healthcare Enterprise
- Omaha System
- SNOMED
- SNOMED CT
- ASC X12 (EDI) – transaction protocols used for transmitting patient data. Popular in the United States for transmission of billing data.
- CEN's TC/251 provides EHR standards in Europe including:
  - EN 13606, communication standards for EHR information
  - CONTSYS (EN 13940), supports continuity of care record standardization.
  - HISA (EN 12967), a services standard for inter-system communication in a clinical information environment.
- Continuity of Care Record – ASTM International Continuity of Care Record standard
- DICOM – an international communications protocol standard for representing and transmitting radiology (and other) image-based data, sponsored by NEMA (National Electrical Manufacturers Association)
- HL7 (HL7v2, C-CDA) – a standardized messaging and text communications protocol between hospital and physician record systems, and between practice management systems
- Fast Healthcare Interoperability Resources (FHIR) – a modernized proposal from HL7 designed to provide open, granular access to medical information
- ISO – ISO TC 215 provides international technical specifications for EHRs. ISO 18308 describes EHR architectures
- xDT – a family of data exchange formats for medical purposes that is used in the German public health system.
- openEHR: an open community developed specification for a shared health record with web-based content developed online by experts. Strong multilingual capability.
- Virtual Medical Record: HL7's proposed model for interfacing with clinical decision support systems.
- SMART (Substitutable Medical Apps, reusable technologies): an open platform specification to provide a standard base for healthcare applications.
- Sentinel Common Data Model: Initially started as Mini-Sentinel in 2008. Use by the Sentinel Initiative of the USA's Food and Drug Administration.
- OMOP Common Data Model: model that defines how electronic health record data, medical billing data or other healthcare data from multiple institutions can be harmonized and queried in unified way. It is maintained by Observational Health Data Sciences and Informatics consortium.
- PCORNet Common Data Model: First defined in 2014 and used by PCORI and People-Centered Research Foundation.
- Virtual Data Warehouse: First defined in 2006 by HMO Research Network. Since 2015, by Health Care System Research Network.

== Previous standards, projects and bodies ==
- Health Metrics Network
- Read code
- ASTM E1238

== Bodies working in the field ==
- Health Level Seven International
- International Health Terminology Standards Development Organisation
- Professional Record Standards Body
- NHS England, which provides a Data Standards Directory
