= Genomic and medical data =

Genomic and medical data refers to an area within genetics that concerns the recording, sequencing and analysis of an organism's genome.

== Background ==
Genomics is a concept that was first developed by Fred Sanger who first sequenced the complete genome of a virus and of a mitochondrion. The term genomics was first coined in 1986 by Tom Roderick, a geneticist at the Jackson Laboratory in Maine, during a meeting about the mapping of the human genome.

The genome is the entire DNA content that is present within one cell of an organism. Experts in genomics strive to determine consummate DNA sequences and perform genetic mapping to help understand disease. Genomics involves the study of all genes at the DNA (deoxyribonucleic Acid), mRNA (messenger ribonucleic acid), and proteome level as well as the cellular or tissue level.

== Open source tools for medical data ==
OMOP: It is an acronym for Observational Medical Outcomes Partnership. The OMOP research program was initially established under Foundation for NIH) and created first version of OMOP common data model. The common data model was able to accommodate observational data of different types (both claims and electronic health records). It has a single common infrastructure that can accommodate both of the types from different sources around the world. It has successfully developed and executed large-scale statistical analyses capable of enabling active drug safety surveillance across prescription medications.

OHDSI: It stands for Observational Health Data Sciences and Informatics and was initiated in 2013. It is a multi-stakeholder, interdisciplinary collaborative that is striving to bring out the value of observational health data through large-scale analytics. The main objective of OHDSI is to establish a research community for observational health data sciences that enables active engagement across multiple disciplines spanning multiple stakeholder groups.

OpenClinica: It is the world's most widely used, open-source software for clinical research. First released in 2005, OpenClinica is designed to meet the diverse needs of modern research environments. It is built as a lightweight, extensible, and modular application. The software is web based and users can access it with a standard web browser and internet connection.

OpenEHR: It is an open standard specification in health informatics that describes the management and storage, retrieval and exchange of health data in electronic health records. In OpenEHR, all health data for a person is stored in a "one lifetime", vendor-independent, person-centered EHR.

Clinical3PO: clinical3po is an open source big data environment for the Veteran Affairs informatics and computing infrastructure, enables scalable markup of electronic health record events to be used for predictive analysis.

== Open Source tools for Genetic Data ==
Beacon Project: Beacon Project is an open web service that tests the willingness of international sites to share genetic data. It is being implemented on the websites of the world's top genomic research organizations.

Matchmaker Exchange: Matchmaker Exchange is a federated network of databases whose goal is to find genetic causes of rare diseases by matching similar phenotypic and genotypic profiles.

BRCA Challenge: The BRCA Challenge aims to advance understanding of the genetic basis of breast and other cancers using data from around the world.

== Gather and use genetic data in health care ==
More and more people are getting their DNA sequenced, but the use of genetic data to inform medical decisions is lagging. More than a decade since the Human Genome Project was declared complete, fewer than 60 genetic variants are deemed worthy for use in clinical care, most for severe conditions in very young children. These genetic variants can guide medical decisions. Genomic data alone is not very useful, but needs to be examined in the right context in research and healthcare

Some health-care organizations are working out ways to collect evidence from ongoing care to improve patient outcomes. Such efforts systematically analyze clinical data from peer-reviewed literature and introduce selected findings into clinical care. Then they track and evaluate outcomes.

One of the best examples of such a 'learning health-care system' is the Geisinger Health System, which serves 2.6 million patients in Pennsylvania. Once diagnosed with chronic conditions such as diabetes, heart failure or depression, patients' care and outcomes are monitored. Metrics such as hospitalization rates are used to recommend that certain individuals receive coordinated attention from a team of specialists including mental-health practitioners and nutritionists. Over three years, this reduced hospital admissions by 18% and seemed to reduce spending by 7%.
