= System of concepts to support continuity of care =

The system of concepts to support continuity of care, often referred to as ContSys, is an ISO and CEN standard (EN ISO 13940). Continuity of care is an organisational principle that represents an important aspect of quality and safety in health care. Semantic interoperability is a basic requirement for continuity of care. Concepts that are needed for these purposes must represent both the content and context of the health care services.

== History of ContSys ==
The first part focusing on basic concepts was published as a European Norm in 2007. It was prepared by working group 2 of CEN TC251 - Health Informatics. Work to take the standard through ISO and to develop a second part focused on the healthcare process had proven problematic, resulting in the withdrawal of the two ISO work items on 13 January 2011 and a proposed resolution in CEN TC251 to stop the development of part 2 from CEN. A single standard combining the general concepts and process concepts was developed in ISO Technical Committee 215 - Health Informatics providing a single overarching concept model for health informatics. The work was led in ISO TC 215 Working Group 3 (Semantic content) with active contribution from ISO TC215 Working Group 1 (Architecture, Frameworks and Models) and specialist contribution from ISO TC215 Working Group 4 (Security, Safety and Privacy). The combined standard was published by ISO on 15 December 2015 and published unaltered by CEN in January 2016.

== Concept modelling ==
The concept models are created according to ISO TR 24156. Concept modelling may be used for two purposes. The main purpose is to graphically describe a concept system within a subject field. This description can clarify the relationships between the concepts and illustrate some of their definitions. The other purpose is to let a concept modelling tool set up a data base organising the concept system, in order to keep track of its concepts and relationships, as well as check its consistency. Information modelling has the purpose of organising the information objects, each one representing knowledge about a concept. There is however additional information in an information model about the properties of the information objects, shown as attributes to the objects and operations describing behaviour of the objects.

== Areas covered by the standard ==
Architecture of the concept areas in ISO 13940 - Health Informatics - System of concepts to support continuity of care

The standard has concepts covering the following topics:

- Healthcare actors in clause 5
- Healthcare matters in clause 6
- Activities in clause 7
- Process in clause 8
- Healthcare planning, including care plans, in clause 9
- Time in clause 10
- Responsibilities in clause 11
- Information management, including health records, in clause 12

The standard includes informative content available to browse on the ISO Online Browsing Platform including

- Introduction
- Scope
- Normative references
- Terms and definitions

The standard is completed with a normative clause on conformance and a discussion of the framework for the normative concepts.

== Areas not covered by the standard ==
The standard describes a system of concepts for the continuity of care. It does not provide an information model, record model or document structure. Some examples of these which should complement this standard are:

- Continuity of Care Record
- Continuity of Care Document
- EN ISO 13606 Health informatics - Electronic Health Record Communication and the related OpenEHR
- HL7 Clinical Document Architecture
- Health Informatics Service Architecture

== ContSys and the clinical process ==
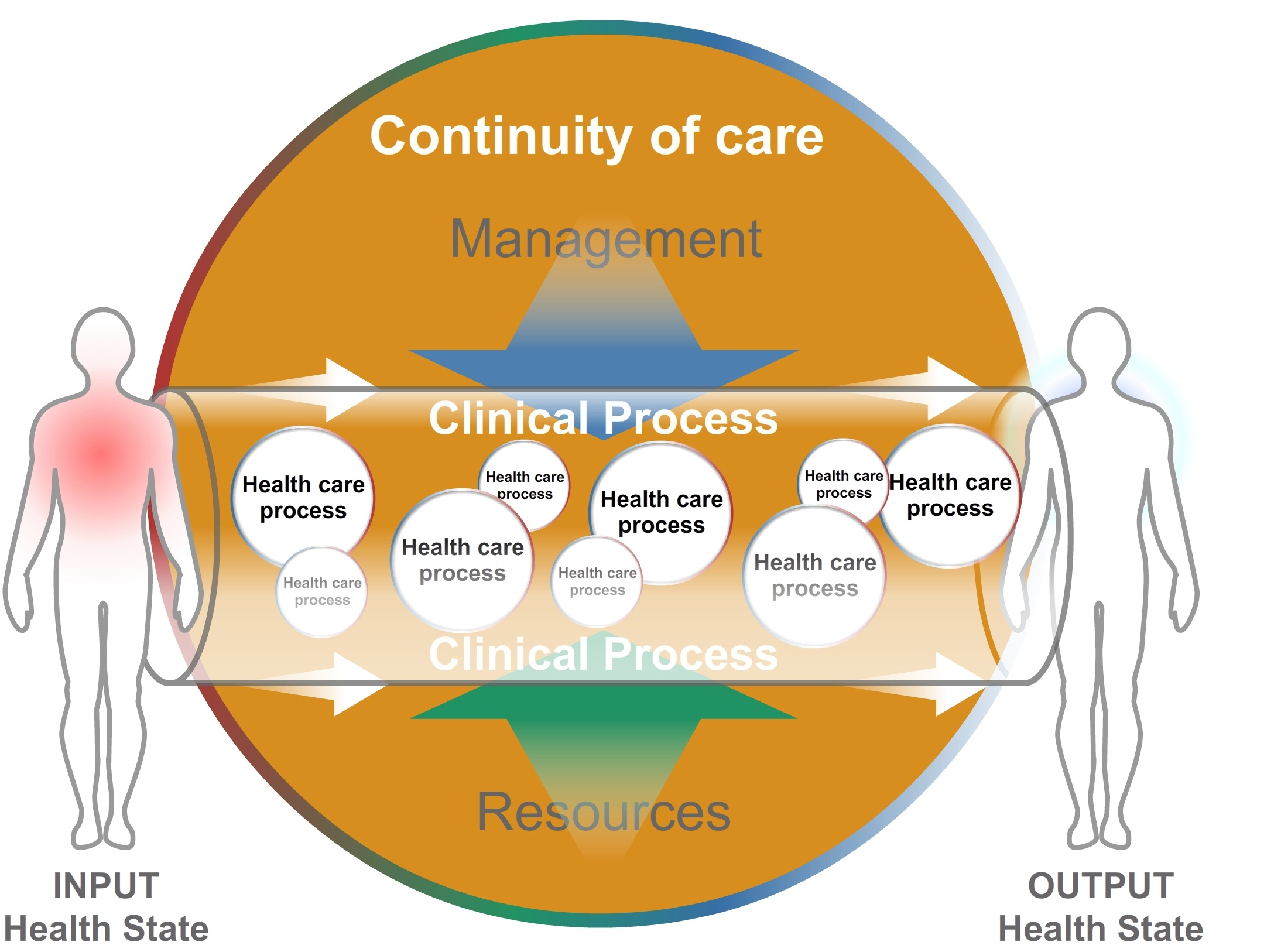
Clinical Process and Health Care Process

The continuity of care is achieved in clinical processes. Continuity is influenced by factors of management and support. To cover continuity of care concepts from these basic process aspects are required:

- Core clinical process
- Management
- Support

Concepts for information and financial management to support continuity of care are also required. The relation between the business areas that have to be covered from continuity perspectives is used to structure this standard. The business areas are equivalent to areas of other perspectives e.g. information as well as IT functionality areas. The business model of the clinical process is focussed also in the information and the information support perspectives. The multiple perspectives of the areas may also include areas of groups of concepts in this standard.

== Applications of ContSys ==
ContSys has been shown by the National Health Service in England to assist in business analysis by providing a model of how health care is organised.

The Swedish national e-health approach is using ContSys as a basis for harmonisation across standards.

A number of governments are exploring the option of using ContSys as a harmonised concept model to enable their information models to be compatible.

The County Council of Skåne, Region Skåne in Sweden, has created clinical reference models from ContSys concepts to develop coherent clinical applications. The process used was to make an XML schema/service for each reference structure, to document the specialisation and to use it in an implementation.

In the article "Modeling shared care plans using ContSys and openEHR to support shared homecare of the elderly", the authors describe how the European Standard EN 13940-1 for continuity of care and the reference model of openEHR, were applied in modeling a shared care plan for shared homecare based on requirements from the OLD@HOME project. Their study shows that these requirements are matched by ContSys on a general level. However, certain attributes were not explicit in ContSys, for example agents responsible for performing planned interventions, and support for monitoring outcome of interventions. They further studied how the care plan conceptual model can be implemented using the openEHR reference model. The study demonstrates the feasibility of developing shared care plans combining a standard concept model, for example ContSys with an electronic health records (EHR) interoperability specification, that is the openEHR, while highlighting areas that need further exploration. It also explores the reusability of existing clinical archetypes as building blocks of care plans and the modeling of new shared care plan archetypes.

== Conformance criteria ==
The conformance criteria in the committee draft have been substantially revised compared with the precursor standard. The main focus of conformance defined in the committee draft is on models and model driven systems however other International Standards may also conform to this standard. The criteria are summarised as:

- If the concept is used within a product it should be referred to using one of that concept's recognised names
- If one of the recognised names is used, the normative definition applies to that concept
- Conformance applies to that part of a product which overlaps the scope of ContSys
- Specialisations refine a concept—they do not extend a concept
- Multiplicities on associations between concepts can be constrained within the multiplicities defined in the standard

== See also ==
- List of ISO standards
- Transitional care
