= Belgian Health Telematics Commission =

Belgian committee for the sharing of health information

The Belgian Health Telematics Commission (BHTC) is a Belgian government committee working on standards for exchanging and sharing of health information, between health care participants. The committee provides advice on eHealth to the Belgian government. Professor Georges De Moor is head of the committee.

The BHTC consists of several working groups:

- Data
- Hospitals
- Telemedicine
- Label: homologation of (para)medical software

Georges De Moor, together with Jos Devlies and Geert Thienpont, authored the 2006 eHealth strategy and implementation activities in Belgium report.

== See also ==
- Belgian Medical Informatics Association
- BeHealth
- FLOW
- KMEHR
- SumEHR
- HL7
- European Institute for Health Records
- ProRec
- EUDRANET

== Sources ==
- Telematics Commission
- Rcommendations
- Telematics Standards in relation to the Health Sector (PDF, advice)
