= Canada Health Infoway =

Canadian nonprofit organization

Canada Health Infoway is an independent, federally funded, not-for-profit organization tasked with accelerating the adoption of digital health solutions, such as electronic health records, across Canada. Infoway is focused on two strategic goals:

- Providing safer access to medications, starting with PrescribeIT, a multi-jurisdiction e-prescribing service
- Providing Canadians and their health care providers with access to personal health information and digital health services.

The use of digital health solutions is intended to improve access to care for Canadians, improve the efficiency of individual health care providers and make the health care system as a whole more efficient.

According to a Canadian Medical Association Workforce Survey, 85 per cent of primary care providers have electronic medical records. As of 2018, the Government of Canada has allocated $2.45 billion to Canada Health Infoway.

== Goals ==
Canada Health Infoway's goal is to improve the patient experience in order to improve the health of populations and unlock value for the health care system. Infoway has helped fund several types of digital health solutions, such as laboratory information systems, diagnostic imaging systems, drug information systems, registries and interoperable electronic health records.

It has been reported that electronic medical records saved $1.3 billion over six years, improved chronic disease management and improved communications amongst care providers. Electronic health records, or connected health information through digital health systems such as diagnostic imaging, medication profiles, laboratory test results and other clinical reports produces $1 billion in value for the Canadian health care system every year.

== Vendors ==
Canada Health Infoway (Infoway) collaborates with technology providers through its Vendor Innovation Program (VIP), an initiative that recognizes vendors who advance interoperability, accessibility, and innovation in Canada’s digital health landscape. The program encourages vendors to adopt national standards and contribute to enhancing patient access to their own health information.

2025 Vendor Innovation Program Winners

On April 29, 2025, Canada Health Infoway announced the winners of the 2025 Vendor Innovation Program. These vendors were selected for their efforts in supporting Infoway’s interoperability goals and enabling patients to view their own health data digitally. The program particularly acknowledges vendors integrating standards such as FHIR (Fast Healthcare Interoperability Resources) and contributing to pan-Canadian digital health strategies.

== 2018 Independent Report ==
A March 2018 Independent Performance Evaluation by Bell Browne Molnar & Delicate Consulting Inc. (BBMD) of Infoway's performance under its 2010 funding agreement with the Canadian federal government found, "Infoway has greatly contributed to more timely delivery of health care, increased productivity and interoperability, improved access to, and sharing of information. The 2010 Funding Agreement has led to economic stimulus and the creation of many knowledge-based jobs."

== Auditor General report ==
A 2009 report by the Auditor General of Canada found that Canada Health Infoway showed "due regard" for taxpayers' money in its financial management. Canada Health Infoway accepted all recommendations listed in the report.

Auditor-General Sheila Fraser's 2010 report states "Infoway has accomplished much in the eight years since its creation. Using the funding agreements with Health Canada as a starting point, Infoway developed an approach to providing for compatible electronic health records by identifying the key requirements and components of an EHR and developing a blueprint for the design of health information systems. It consulted widely with partners and stakeholders to obtain their input and support. In addition, it established appropriate governance mechanisms and developed a risk management strategy. It has implemented appropriate management controls for operational spending, although controls for contracting for goods and services need to be strengthened."

== See also ==
- European Institute for Health Records
- National Resource Center for Health Information Technology (US)
- Royal Commission on the Future of Health Care in Canada
- ISO TC 215
- RTSS
