= Archetype (information science) =

In the field of informatics, an archetype is a formal re-usable model of a domain concept. Traditionally, the term archetype is used in psychology to mean an idealized model of a person, personality or behaviour (see Archetype). The usage of the term in informatics is derived from this traditional meaning, but applied to domain modelling instead.

An archetype is defined by the OpenEHR Foundation (for health informatics) as follows:

An archetype is a computable expression of a domain content model in the form of structured constraint statements, based on some reference model. openEHR archetypes are based on the openEHR reference model. Archetypes are all expressed in the same formalism. In general, they are defined for wide re-use, however, they can be specialized to include local particularities. They can accommodate any number of natural languages and terminologies.

== Formal specifications ==
The modern archetype formalism is specified and maintained by the openEHR Foundation, and although originally developed for the health IT domain, is completely domain-independent, and has been used in geospatial modelling, telecommunications, and defence.

The archetype formalism consists of a number of specifications including:

- 'ADL 1.4': original release of Archetype Definition Language (ADL) and Archetype Object Model (AOM); widely implemented in health IT domain;
- 'ADL 2': modern release of Archetype Definition Language (ADL), Archetype Object Model (AOM), Archetype Identification specification and Archetype Technology Overview.

The Archetype Technology Overview provides a short technical overview of the archetype formalism useful for new users.

The ADL/AOM 1.4 specifications were provided to ISO TC 215 in 2008 by the openEHR Foundation and became the ISO 13606-2 standard, extant until 2019. ISO TC 215 accepted the AOM 2 specification as the basis for a revision of this standard, which was issued in 2019.

In late 2015, the Object Management Group (OMG) accepted an RfP entitled 'Archetype Modeling Language (AML)' as a new candidate standard. This specification is a form of ADL re-engineered as a UML profile so as to enable archetype modelling to be supported within UML tools.

== Tools ==
A number of tools area available for working with archetypes. Most are listed on the openEHR modelling tools page. They include:

- ADL Designer, a modern AOM2-based web editing application
- Archetype Editor, an original desktop clinical modelling tool
- Template Designer, an original desktop clinical templating tool
- LinkEHR, an archetype and data integration tool
- ADL Workbench, reference compiler and visualiser tool

== Example ==
--
-- Example of an openEHR Archetype, written in the Archetype Definition Language (ADL)
-- Definition available here: http://www.openehr.org/releases/trunk/architecture/am/adl2.pdf
-- Author: derived from the openEHR-EHR-EVALUATION.adverse_reaction.v1 archetype at http://www.openEHR.org/ckm
--

archetype (adl_version=2.0.5; rm_release=1.0.2; generated)
	openEHR-EHR-EVALUATION.adverse_reaction.v1.0.0

language
	original_language = <[ISO_639-1::en]>

description
	lifecycle_state = <"unmanaged">

definition
	EVALUATION[id1]

terminology
	term_definitions = <
		["en"] = <
			["id1"] = <
				text = <"Adverse Reaction">
				description = <"xxx">
			>
		>
	>

== See also ==
- EHRcom
- European Institute for Health Records
- Good European Health Record
- Health Informatics Service Architecture
- Information science
- openEHR
