= BeHealth =

BeHealth is a Belgian eHealth digital platform which provides digital access to all health information and applications through one portal site, on behalf of both healthcare providers and patients. BeHealth has been created on 23 December 2004. It first aim is to interconnect multiple applications from a number of social security actors, but with the goal to provide broader services over time.

== See also ==
- Telematics
- Belgian Health Telematics Commission (BHTC)
- FLOW
- Summarized Electronic Health Record (SumEHR)
- KMEHR
