= ProRec =

The ProRec initiative of 1996 was a network of national non-profit organisations (the "ProRec centres"). The initiative was a consequence of the conclusions of the Concerted Action MEDIREC (1994-1995) regarding the reasons why Electronic Health Record (EHR) systems were not used more widely in any of the European Union. As part of the Lisbon Declaration suggestions were made to remedy this situation.

The ProRec initiative is supported by the DG Information Society of the European Union. The DG Information Society supported the ProRec initiative with the ProRec Support Action (1996-1998), and the WIDENET Accompanying Measure (2000-2003).

The goal of the initiative is to build awareness of the limitations, shortcomings and obstacles on the way towards widespread development, implementation and use of quality Electronic Health Records (EHRs) and pointing them out. Especially significant for implementing Electronic Health Record systems is the ability to communicate and interoperate.

== See also ==
- CEN/TC 251
- EHRcom
- European Institute for Health Records (EuroRec)
- European Health Telematics Association (EHTEL)
- European Health Telematics Observatory (EHTO)
- Health Informatics Service Architecture (HISA)
