= Roberto Viola =

Roberto Viola may refer to:

- Roberto Viola (civil servant), Italian civil servant
- Roberto Eduardo Viola, Argentine military officer and president of Argentina
