= National Resource Center for Health Information Technology =

In 2004, the Agency for Healthcare Research and Quality of the United States Department of Health and Human Services created the AHRQ National Resource Center for Health Information Technology (the National Resource Center or NRC) to support over 125 federal grants and contracts that are demonstrating the value and implementation of information technology in health care (health information technology).

With leadership from the National Opinion Research Center (NORC), the Regenstrief Institute, the Vanderbilt Center for Better Health, the Center for IT Leadership (CITL) and the eHealth Initiative, the NRC monitors and provides technical assistance to federal grants that are implementing technologies such as Electronic health records, Computerized Physician Order Entry, Health information exchange (HIE) and Telemedicine. The NRC directs almost half of its efforts and funding towards monitoring health IT development in rural communities.

In addition to its support of federal grants and agencies, the National Resource Center disseminates knowledge and best practices observed by the projects it supports. By way of the NRC's web site, health providers, administrators and researchers share lessons learned for how best to improve health care quality, safety, and efficiency in the United States through successful health IT adoption and usage.

The NRC does not provide grant money to individuals or organizations to do research in the fields of health care or health informatics. The NRC does provide, however, free educational resources and events where theory and case examples are presented by researchers active in these fields.

== See also ==
- Canada Health Infoway
- European Institute for Health Records
- ISO TC 215
