= CEN/TC 251 =

European Union technical standards committee

CEN/TC 251 (CEN Technical Committee 251) is a technical decision making body within the European Committee for Standardization (CEN) working on standardization in the field of Health Information and Communications Technology (ICT) in the European Union. The goal is to achieve compatibility and interoperability between independent systems and to enable modularity in Electronic Health Record systems.

Workgroups establish requirements for health information structure in order to support clinical and administrative procedures, technical methods to support interoperable systems. In addition they establish requirements regarding safety, security and quality.

== Workgroups ==
The two Working Groups (WGs) in CEN/TC 251 are :

- WG 1: Enterprise and Information
- WG 2: Technology and Applications

== See also ==
- ContSys
- EHRcom
- European Institute for Health Records
- Health Informatics Service Architecture (HISA)
- HIPAA (USA)
- Health Level 7 International
- International Classification of Primary Care (ICPC)
- ISO TC 215
- openEHR Foundation
- ProRec
