= Georges De Moor =

Georges De Moor

Georges J. E. De Moor (born 25 August 1953, Ostend, Belgium) is a Belgian medical doctor, clinical pathologist and has been head of the Department of Health Informatics and Medical Statistics of the University of Ghent.

== Education ==
His primary and secondary education was at Saint Barbara College in Ghent (1960–1972). In 1979, he graduated in medicine and afterwards specialized in clinical pathology (1979–1983) and Nuclear Medicine (1982) before obtaining a PhD, summa cum laude, in medical information science at the University of Ghent in 1994.

== Career ==
He has been head of the Department of Medical Informatics and Statistics at the State University of Ghent, Belgium, where he taught health informatics, medical statistics, decision theory and evidence-based medicine since 1995.

As founding president of RAMIT (Research in Medical Informatics and Telematics), he has been involved in both European and International Research and Development projects (+120), as well as in Standardisation activities: for seven years, De Moor acted as the Founding Chairman of CEN/TC251, the official Technical Committee on standardisation in health informatics in Europe.

As a result of the conducted research, De Moor has been founding or co-founding a number of spin-off companies mainly active in eHealth, including the domain of privacy protection (e.g. MediBridge, Custodix).

He was elected President of the European Institute for Health Records (EuroRec) (2004–2010), promoting and certifying high quality Electronic Health Record systems in Europe.

De Moor is also Head of the Clinical Pathology Laboratory in the Saint Elisabeth Hospital in Zottegem, Belgium.

He is member of the board of the Belgian Health Care Knowledge Centre (KCE, Federaal Kenniscentrum Gezondheidszorg).

De Moor chairs in Belgium and in Europe a number of official Committees related to ICT in Health or to Laboratory Medicine. He is member of the Belgian Privacy Protection Committee (partim Health) (Ministry of Justice). He is still member of diverse other boards (Sint-Lucas Hospital Gent, Belgium) (Zeno Hospital Knokke, Belgium).

He has been member of the International Advisory Board of the Farr Institute (UK). He was EU member of the advisory board of the Horizon 2020 programme (SC1: Health, demographic change and wellbeing, 2014–2020)

He has edited twelve books related to ICT in Health and published over 200 articles in scientific journals.

== Awards ==
- 2005: awarded with the International Rory O'Moore Medal (presented by Bertie Ahern, in Dublin) for Health Informatics.

== Sources ==
- The EuroRec Institute
- Ghent University
- Horizon 2020
- KCE
