= Jane Grimson =

Computer engineer

Professor Jane Grimson FREng MRIA
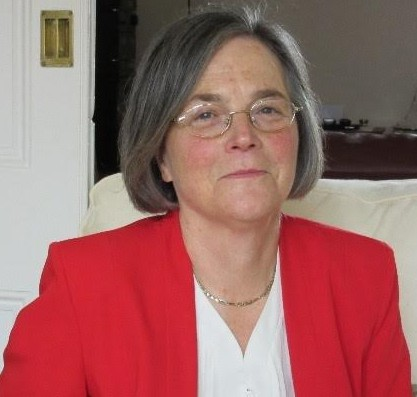
- Born: Jane Grimson; 28 August 1949 (age 77)
- Education: Trinity College Dublin (BA, BAI); University of Toronto (MSc, 1971); University of Edinburgh (PhD, 1981)
- Awards: Elected member Royal Irish Academy (2009); International fellow Royal Academy of Engineering (2004); O'Moore Medal (2007)
- Scientific career
- Fields: Engineering; Health informatics
- Workplaces: Trinity College Dublin
- Thesis: Flexible database management system for a virtual memory machine (1981)
- Website: people.tcd.ie/jgrimson

Jane Barclay Grimson (née Wright) is an Irish computer engineer. She is Fellow Emerita and Pro-Chancellor at Trinity College Dublin.

== Education ==
Grimson attended Alexandra College Dublin. She was the first woman to graduate in engineering from Trinity College Dublin obtaining a first class honors degree and gold medal in 1970. She received a master's degree in Computer Science from the University of Toronto in 1971, and a PhD from the University of Edinburgh in 1981.

== Research and career ==
In 1980, Grimson was appointed to a Lectureship in Computer Science at Trinity College Dublin where she spent her entire academic career, holding a Personal Chair in Health Informatics prior to her retirement in 2014. Her major research interests are in Health Informatics, a field concerned with the application of Information and Communications Technology to improve the quality and safety of healthcare.

=== Senior positions ===
In 1991, she was elected to Fellowship in Trinity College Dublin. Grimson served as Dean of Engineering and Systems Sciences from 1996 to 1999, as pro-Dean of Research in 2001 and as Vice-Provost from 2001 to 2005, being the first woman to ever take these roles. She was appointed Pro-Chancellor of the University of Dublin in 2016.

A chartered Fellow of the Institution of Engineers of Ireland (now Engineers Ireland) and a EUR ING, Professor Grimson served as President of Engineers Ireland from 1999 to 2000, again the first woman to hold this role. She is a Fellow and Past-President (2002) of the Irish Academy of Engineering and of the Irish Computer Society (2000-2004). She was President of the Healthcare Informatics Society of Ireland from 1999 to 2006. Professor Grimson was partially seconded to the newly established Health Information and Quality Authority (HIQA) as its first Director of Health Information in 2007, where she led the development of national standards for health information. In 2014, she was appointed Acting Chief Executive of HIQA, just prior to her retirement.

She has served on numerous boards including Science Foundation Ireland, the Energy Research Council, the European Research Advisory Board, and the Mary Robinson Foundation - Climate Justice and was chair of the board of Mount Temple Comprehensive School, the Irish Research Council for Science, Engineering and Technology and the Health Research Board

=== Diversity work ===
Professor Grimson is an outspoken advocate for the advancement of women in engineering and in research more broadly. She helped to establish WiSER (the Centre for Women in Science and Engineering Research) at Trinity College Dublin, and also chaired a Department of Education and Science committee aiming to increase female representation in Science, Engineering and Technology. She also chaired the Gender Equality Task Force at NUI Galway from 2015 to 2016. She is an honorary member of Women in Technology and Science.

=== Awards and honours ===
Professor Grimson was elected as an International Fellow of the Royal Academy of Engineering in 2004. She was awarded the O'Moore Medal in 2007 in recognition of her contribution to the field of Health Informatics. In 2009, she was elected as a member of the Royal Irish Academy. In 2017 she was awarded an honorary degree by NUI Galway.

== Personal life ==
Professor Grimson's father was Professor Bill Wright, Chair of Civil Engineering in Trinity College Dublin. She married a fellow Engineering student at Trinity, Bill Grimson.
