= O'Moore Medal =

Information science award

The O'Moore Medal is awarded by the Healthcare Informatics Society of Ireland to individuals or organisations that have made a major contribution to Healthcare Informatics. The award is named after Professor Rory O'Moore, who received the award in 2003 when it was inaugurated by then Taoiseach Bertie Ahern.

== Awards ==
- 2003: Rory O'Moore
- 2005: Georges De Moor
- 2007: Jane Grimson
- 2008: Glyn Hayes
- 2009: H. Stephen Lieber
- 2011: Kieran Hickey
- 2018: Richard Corbridge (FBCS)

== See also ==
- List of computer science awards
