= European Health Telematics Observatory =

The European Health Telematics Observatory (EHTO) is a non-profit organization which collects, analyses and makes available in a user-friendly form information on developments in the field of health telematics. The organization contributes to the deployment of health telematics applications and standards in Europe. EHTO works on the dissemination of results of the European Telematics Applications Programme (TAP) of the Fourth Framework Programme to the European health care sector.

== Participants ==
- Portugal: Portugal Telecom
- Belgium: RAMIT (Research in Advanced Medical Informatics and Telematics)
- France: CNEH (Centre National de l'Equipement Hospitalier)
- Ireland: IHC Centre for Health Informatics
- Spain: IETT Ingenieria y Prevencion de Riesgos
- Greece: BIOTRAST
- Finland: VTT Information Technology

== See also ==
- Health informatics
- European Institute for Health Records
- European Health Telematics Association (EHTEL)
- ProRec

== Sources ==
- EHTO (Doc)
- European Telematics
