= Health Research Board =

Irish research support state agency

The Health Research Board (HRB) is a government agency responsible for funding, co-ordination, and oversight of medical research in Ireland.

== History ==
In 1986, the Government of Ireland amalgamated the Medical Research Council of Ireland and the Medico-Social Research Board to establish the HRB under the Health (Corporate Bodies) Act 1961 and statutory instrument 279 of 1986. The HRB's original headquarters was at 73 Lower Baggot Street, Dublin 2. In July 2014, the board relocated to Grattan House, 67-72 Lower Mount Street, Dublin 2.

== Chairs of the HRB ==
- Dr WA Watts 1987–1989
- Professor MX FitzGerald 1990–1997
- Professor MB Murphy 1997–2002
- Professor Hugh R. Brady 2002–2003
- Professor D Fitzgerald 2003–2007
- Mr Reg Shaw 2007–2012
- Dr Declan Bedford 2012–2017
- Professor Jane Grimson 2020 -

== Chief Executives of the HRB ==
- Lt Comdr EJ Furness and Mr J O'Gorman 1987–1988 (jointly, in caretaker roles)
- Dr JV O'Gorman 1988–1998
- Dr R Barrington 1998–2007
- Dr Hamish Sinclair 2007–2008 (acting)
- Mr Enda Connolly 2008–2014
- Dr Graham Love 2014–2017
- Dr Darrin Morrissey 2018–2020
- Dr Mairéad O'Driscoll 2020–2025
- Dr Gráinne Gorman 2025 – present
