= Directorate-General for Communications Networks, Content and Technology =

Directorate-general of the European Commission

The Directorate-General for Communications Networks, Content and Technology (also called DG CONNECT) is a Directorate-General of the European Commission and is responsible for European Union investment in research, innovation and development of popularized digital technologies such as artificial intelligence, high-performance computing, and 5G.

Since 2015, the Director-General is Roberto Viola, under the responsibility of the European Commissioner for Digital and Frontier Technologies, held by Henna Virkkunen since December 2024. In 2025, it had 852 employees.

== Structure ==
The organization of the Director General office as of 2026 was:

- A: Artificial Intelligence (AI) Office (Director: Lucilla Sioli)

The AI Office is responsible for strengthening Europe's competitiveness by stimulating innovation while safeguarding the responsible development and deployment of Artificial Intelligence (AI). The Office develops capabilities and performs the necessary tasks to supervise the AI Act, enforcing the rules on general-purpose models, developing tools, methodologies and benchmarks for their evaluation, and supporting the implementation of the rules on high-risk AI systems as well as on prohibited practices. The AI Office ensures the appropriate governance of the AI Act by working in close collaboration with the AI Board of Member States, the Scientific Panel and the Advisory Forum of stakeholders.

- B: Digital Decade and Connectivity (Director: Kamila Kloc)

Directorate B works on the following items:

The implementation, monitoring and reporting of the Digital Decade Program.

The promotion of access to and take-up of gigabit and 5G networks for all citizens and businesses of the European Union, as one of the key targets of the 2030 Digital Decade policy Programme.

The development of policies and legislation in the area of electronic communications.

The application, monitoring and enforcement of the European regulatory framework for electronic communications.

The monitoring and reviewing the digital parts of Member States’ Recovery and Resilience Plans.

The development of policies and legislations in the area of spectrum and ensuring that Member States efficiently manage and use harmonised spectrum.

- Directorate C: Enabling and Emerging Technologies (Director: Kilian Gross)

Directorate C's objective is to strengthen Europe's leadership in enabling and emerging digital technologies and infrastructures and foster the build-up of competitive value chains and ecosystems in such technologies. This entails supporting the development and market uptake of cutting-edge semiconductor, photonics, super-computing and quantum technologies; supporting the development, deployment and access to world-class semiconductor, photonics, super-computing and quantum technology infrastructures, applications and services, including in AI Factories; and enabling the transition towards digital networks robust against new security threats posed by developments in supercomputing and quantum computing.

- D: Online Platforms Economy (Director: Rita Wezenbeek)

The mission of Directorate D is to enforce the Digital Services Act (DSA) and the Digital Markets Act (DMA) with a focus on their economic and market-related dimensions.

- E: Future Networks (Director: Thibaut Kleiner)

The Directorate E is responsible for strategic advancement of the policy, technological research and standardisation on all-encompassing Future Internet dimension, ensuring an innovative intertwining of all these aspects so that Europe can lead in the design, piloting and roll-out of the Internet of tomorrow. Its strategic agenda focuses on components that are crucial for the digital economy, including 5G global policy advancement, research, innovation and deployment of future mobile systems, strategic use of spectrum, implementation of cloud policies, support to software strategy and implementation of a common European IoT agenda, while addressing a long-term perspective for the Internet.

- F: Online Platforms Society (acting director: Prabhat Agarwal)

The mission of Directorate F is to enforce the Digital Services Act (DSA) with a focus on the societal impacts and risks arising from the use of online platforms in the Union.

- G: Data (Director: Yvo Volman)

The mission of Directorate G is threefold: to set up framework conditions for a thriving European data economy, to exploit the potential of the European cultural heritage and creative industries; to contribute to removing digital barriers that lead to social and economic disparities, such as language, accessibility and education.

- H: Cybersecurity and Trust (acting director: Christiane Kirketerp de Viron)

Directorate H is responsible for all cybersecurity matters, including technology, related capacity building, policy and laws such as NIS2, Cyber Resilience Act, Cyber Solidarity Act, EU Cyber Defence policy, the EU Cyber Reserve as well as cyber crisis coordination and cable security. It is also responsible for digital identity and trust, including the development of the EU Digital Identity Wallets and the European Business Wallet.

- I: Media Policy (Director: Giuseppe Abbamonte)

The Directorate supports the development of a competitive European audiovisual and media industry able to reach out to new audiences and thrive in the Digital Single Market. The Directorate ensures that the audiovisual and copyright legislative frameworks are fit for purpose in the digital era and promote the circulation of works across borders and reward innovation. Through support actions, it fosters the creation, distribution, and promotion of European works across Europe and beyond. It supports research on new technologies and services resulting from convergence and social media in any device and mobile environments.

The Directorate monitors the threats to media independence and journalists across the EU. The Directorate promotes Europe's cultural diversity and the production of news on European affairs with a European perspective.

- R: Resources and Support (Director: Anne Montagnon)

To support DG Connect's people and operations, including those related to research projects in H2020, CEF, FP7 and CIP.

== Resources ==
A significant part of its activities is devoted to research in areas where it can provide stimulus and support to Member State research, including coordination, cooperation, standardisation and long-term basic research activities.

Significant staff cuts were planned for 2014.

== History ==
From January 2005, the DG Information Society was expanded to include Media (formerly under DG Education and Culture). DG INFSO deals with research, policy and regulation on the areas of information and communication technology and media. Its regulation has cultural, societal and economic objectives, and covers some of the largest economic sectors in Europe, as well as some of the most visible. The DG is however not responsible for some general economic and market issues central to information society policies like intellectual property issues.

On 1 July 2012, the DG Connect replaced the DG for Information Society & Media (DG INFSO). The mission will also change and large staff cuts are foreseen (from 1 January 2013 a substantial part of the ex-INFSO agenda will be externalised). DG INFSO was previously known as DG XIII. Until 2004, the DG shared Commissioner with DG Enterprise.

== See also ==
- European Commissioner for Internal Market
- Executive Vice President of the European Commission for A Europe Fit for the Digital Age
- Ambient Assisted Living (AAL)
- EU Open Data Portal
- European Artificial Intelligence Office
- European Institute for Health Records (EUROREC)
- European Round Table of Industrialists
- Media Plus
- ProRec
- World Intellectual Property Organization
