= Réseau de télécommunications sociosanitaire =

The Réseau de télécommunications sociosanitaire is the internal network of the health sector of the province of Quebec and administered by Quebec's Ministry of Health and Social Services.

All hospitals and CLSCs, and many CHSLDs are connected and so can share information and services.
