= XDT =

xDT (a.k.a. KVDT) is a family of data exchange formats that are used by physicians and health care administration in Germany. They were created by initiative of the Kassenärztliche Bundesvereinigung (National Association of Statutory Health Insurance Physicians - NASHIP).

== Formats ==
As of October 2013 the following formats have been implemented:

- ADT (Abrechnungsdatentransfer): A format for transferring billing data
- BDT (Behandlungsdatentransfer): A format for exchange of complete electronic health records among electronic health record software systems
- GDT (Gerätedatentransfer): A format to transfer data among medical devices and software systems
- LDT (Labordatentransfer): A format to transfer orders of laboratory tests and their results.
