= Lloyd George envelope =

Paper wallets used by UK doctors

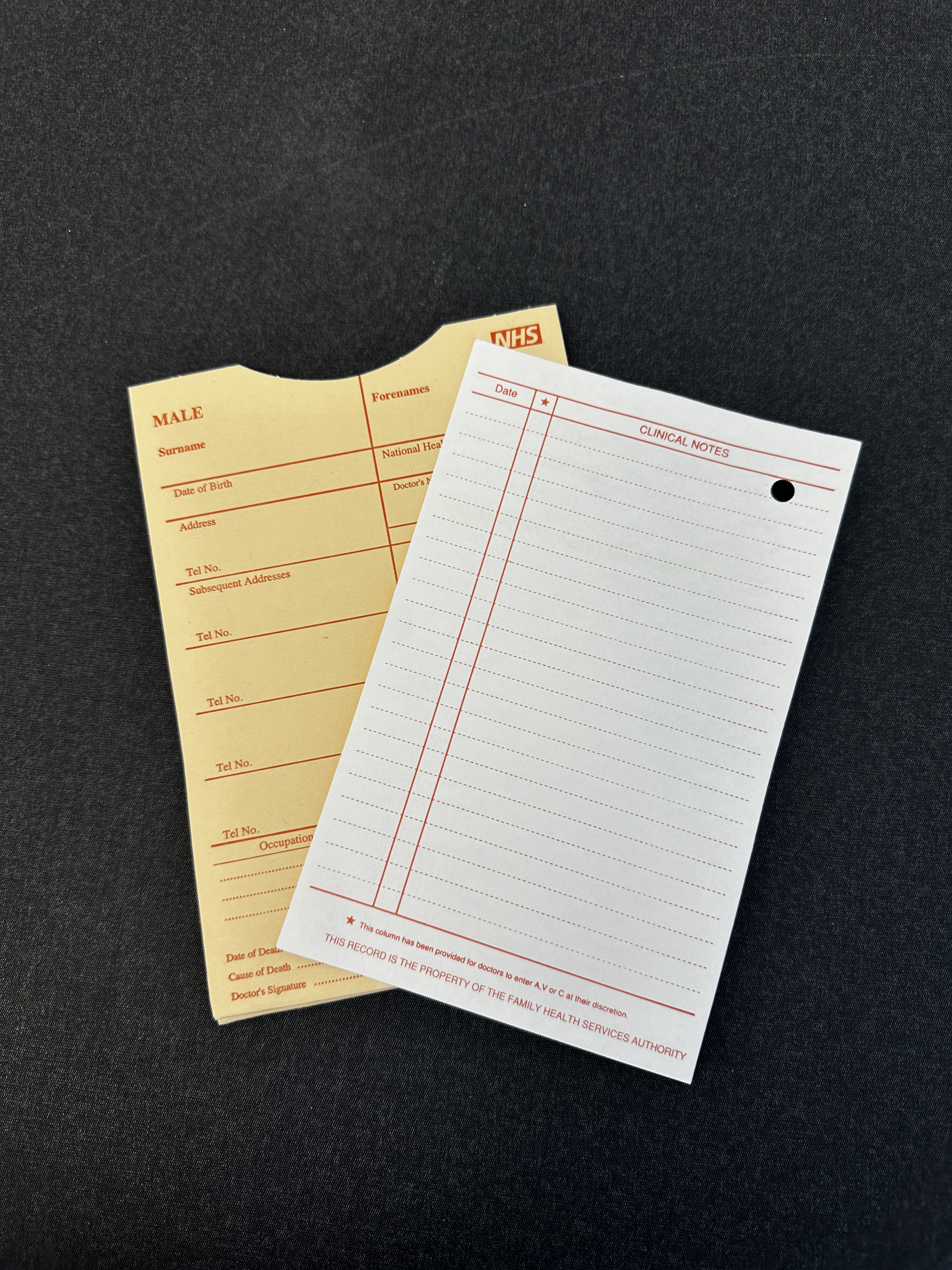
Lloyd George envelope with insert

Lloyd George envelopes, named after the British former prime minister David Lloyd George, are paper wallets used by general practitioners in the United Kingdom to record and store medical information on their patients. They were produced in beige card, and distributed to general practices until January 2021. Envelopes for male patients have red print, those for female patients blue print. Each measures 130 mm × 180 mm (5.1 in × 7.1 in) and has provision for additional inserts.

Lloyd George cards were first used for workers who paid into National Health Insurance, a scheme introduced following the National Insurance Act 1911. The envelopes were introduced during the First World War and continued in use following the formation of the National Health Service (NHS) in 1948.

The records provided an easy to visualise summary, prevented unnecessary lengthy note making, and could be carried in a doctor's coat pocket when out on a home visit. However, limited writing space resulted in brief inconsistent record keeping, and encouraged illegible handwriting.

From the 1950s, as record keeping became more detailed and hospital interventions resulted in more correspondences, the relatively small Lloyd George envelopes became increasingly bulky. They were phased out in the late twentieth century and replaced to some extent with A4 folders, and eventually digitised with the adoption of computerised medical records.

== Origin ==
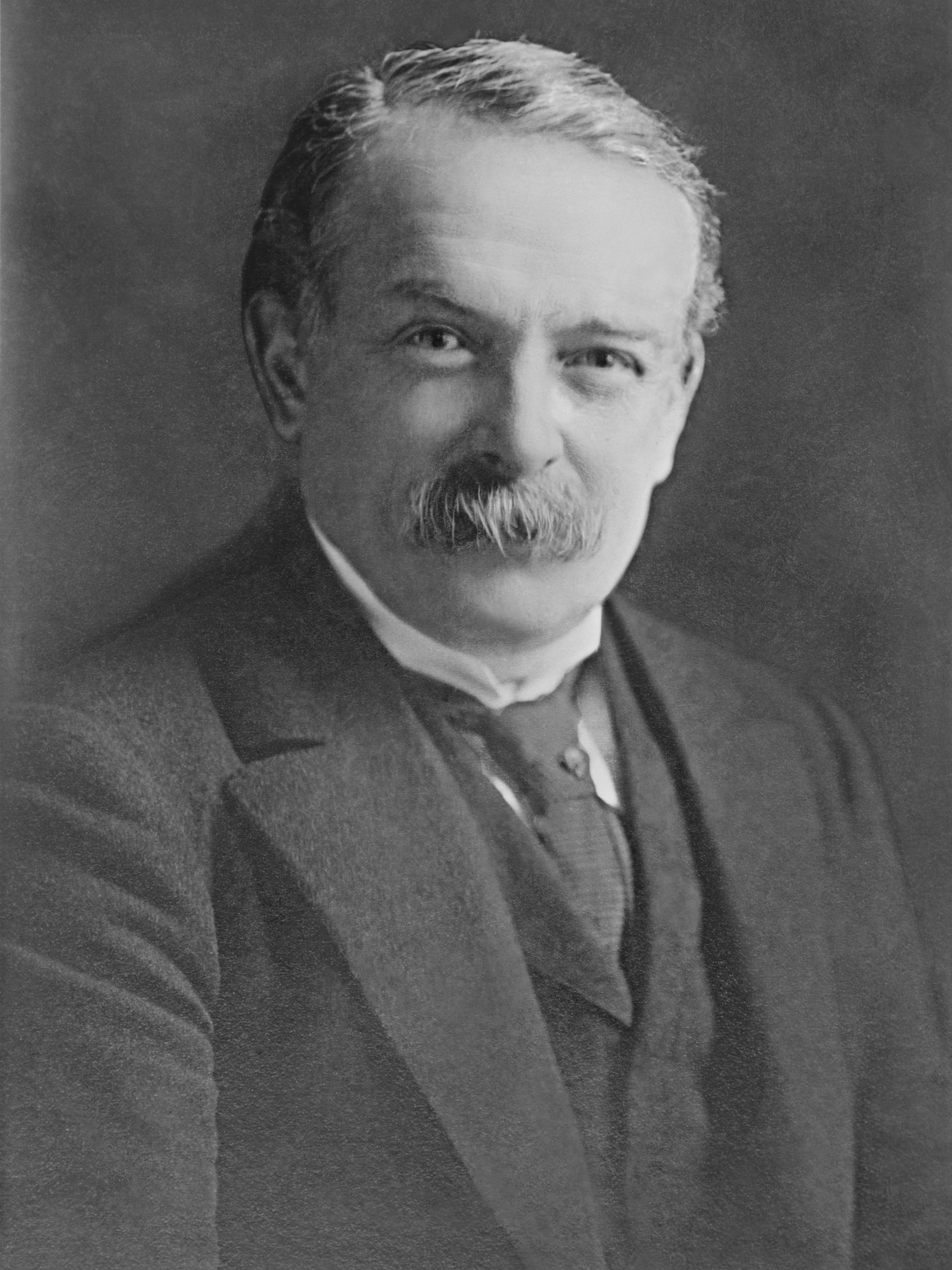
David Lloyd George

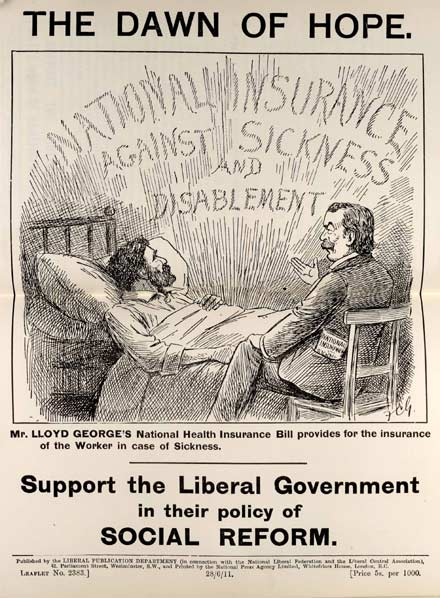
National Insurance Act 1911

David Lloyd George introduced a card to record medical information for low-income male workers who paid into National Health Insurance, a scheme introduced following the National Insurance Act 1911, when he was Chancellor of the Exchequer. Its creation has been seen as the beginning of the development of a nationally compatible records system.

Between 1911 and the formation of the NHS in 1948, the record-keeping cards were in general use by health boards. The envelopes were introduced during the First World War. Their size was based on their storage in the large number of available ammunition boxes during the First World War.

== Design and usage ==
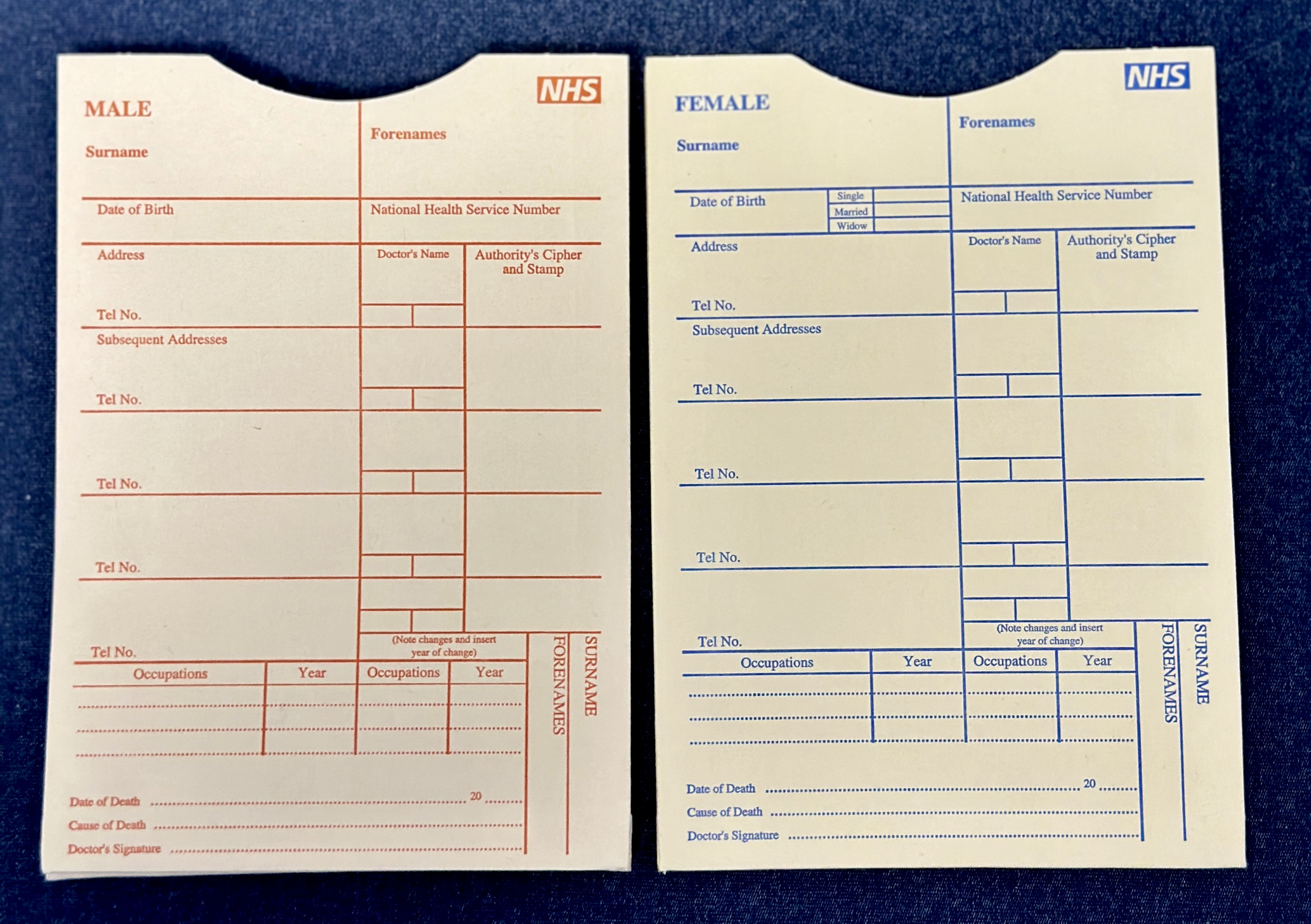
Lloyd George envelopes (red for males, blue for females)

Lloyd George envelopes are beige-coloured card wallets and measure 130 mm × 180 mm (5.1 in × 7.1 in) with red or blue markings for male or female patients, respectively. One was allocated for every individual in the UK population, from birth and upon registration with a general practitioner. Owned by the Secretary of State for Health, the Lloyd George record stayed with the individual's GP, wherever they moved to in the UK, and hence contain a person's lifelong health record. Continuation cards can be inserted inside. These have the date of printing in the bottom right-hand corner.

The Lloyd George record has been seen by some to have a certain sense of privacy, with notes tucked away in the wallet, unlike being visible on a computer screen. Their small size was seen by some as "easy to handle". The notes generally served as an aide-mémoire for the doctor. They provided an easy to visualise summary, prevented unnecessary lengthy note making and could be carried in the doctor's coat pocket when out on a home visit.

== Limitations ==
Recorded detail varied between physicians, and ranged from documenting every illness to omitting major surgical procedures. Not all doctors even utilised the inserted summary card, until after 1990 when financial incentives to treat longterm conditions such as asthma and diabetes arose.

The limited space to document details reflected, to some extent, the type of medicine practised in the early twentieth century. People's expectations, limited medical knowledge, short consultation times, and limited medical tests all contributed to the brief notes that were made by general practitioners, which discouraged detail and encouraged illegible handwriting. It also led to the use of acronyms, such as "FLK" for "funny looking kid", and "TATT" for "tired all the time". Recording treatment of strep throat would be shortened to "ST.Pen", for example, without any elaboration on a person's history, examination findings, or drug doses.

In the 1970s and 80s the debate about whether the Lloyd George record had any advantage in switching to A4 folders was a major issue. Hospital letters typically arrived in an A4 form and needed to be folded to fit into a Lloyd George envelope, whereas new sheets were easily added into the larger folders. Medical record-keeping varied among practices, from solely using Lloyd George records, to adapting them, to using a combination of Lloyd George and A4, to, in a few cases, moving to computer records. Effective use of Lloyd George records was seen as requiring an almost obsessional attention to detail.

== Discontinuation ==
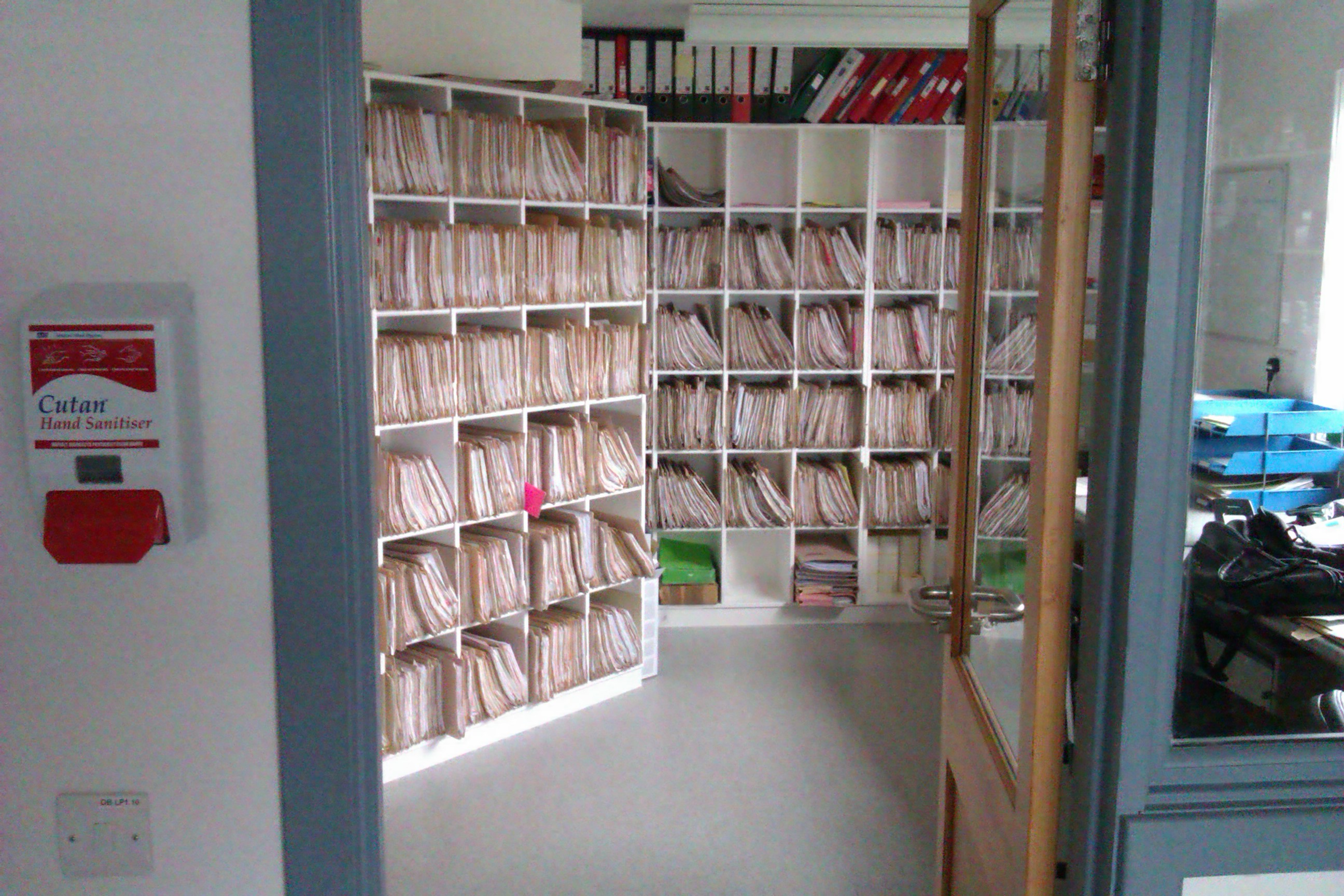
GP records in A4 folders

In the latter part of the twentieth century, as record keeping became more detailed and hospital interventions resulted in more documentations, the Lloyd George envelopes became increasingly bulky. Whether hospital letters should be inserted into the envelopes folded with the writing on the inside for confidentiality, or outside for easy visibility, was just one matter for debate. For people with longterm conditions, the envelopes became full, frequently requiring joining envelopes together, which was typically done using Sellotape or rubber bands. In 1974, a recommendation to replace the small envelopes with larger A4 folders, came from a joint working party of the Health Departments for England, Wales and Scotland, health authorities and general practitioners. The envelopes were phased out in the late twentieth century and mostly replaced with A4 folders, and eventually digitised with the adoption of computerised medical records.

The NHS stopped issuing new envelopes for first-time registrations in January 2021. Since then, no further Lloyd George envelopes are produced.

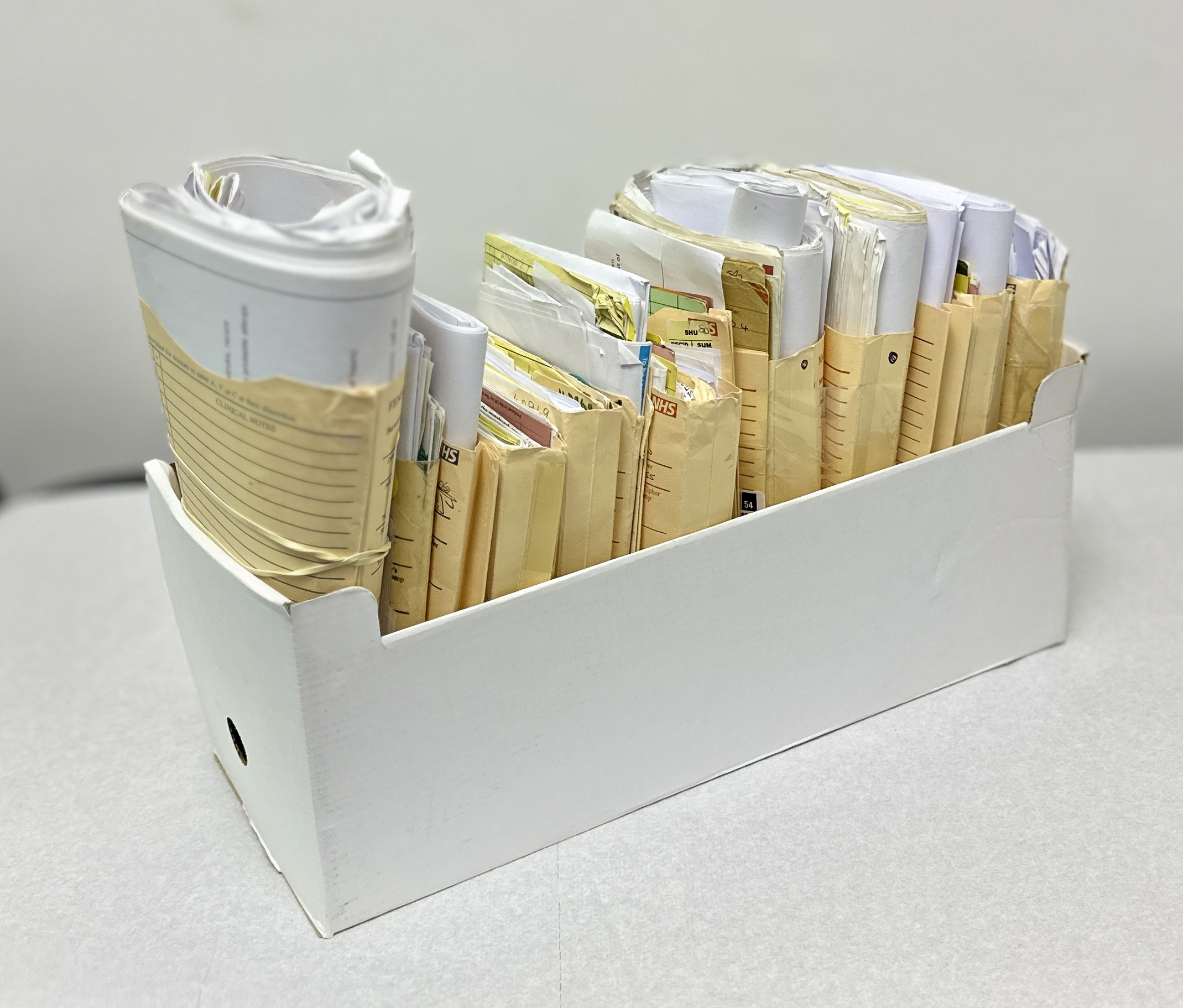
Lloyd George envelopes stacked in box: compact, with insertion cards and folded hospital letters

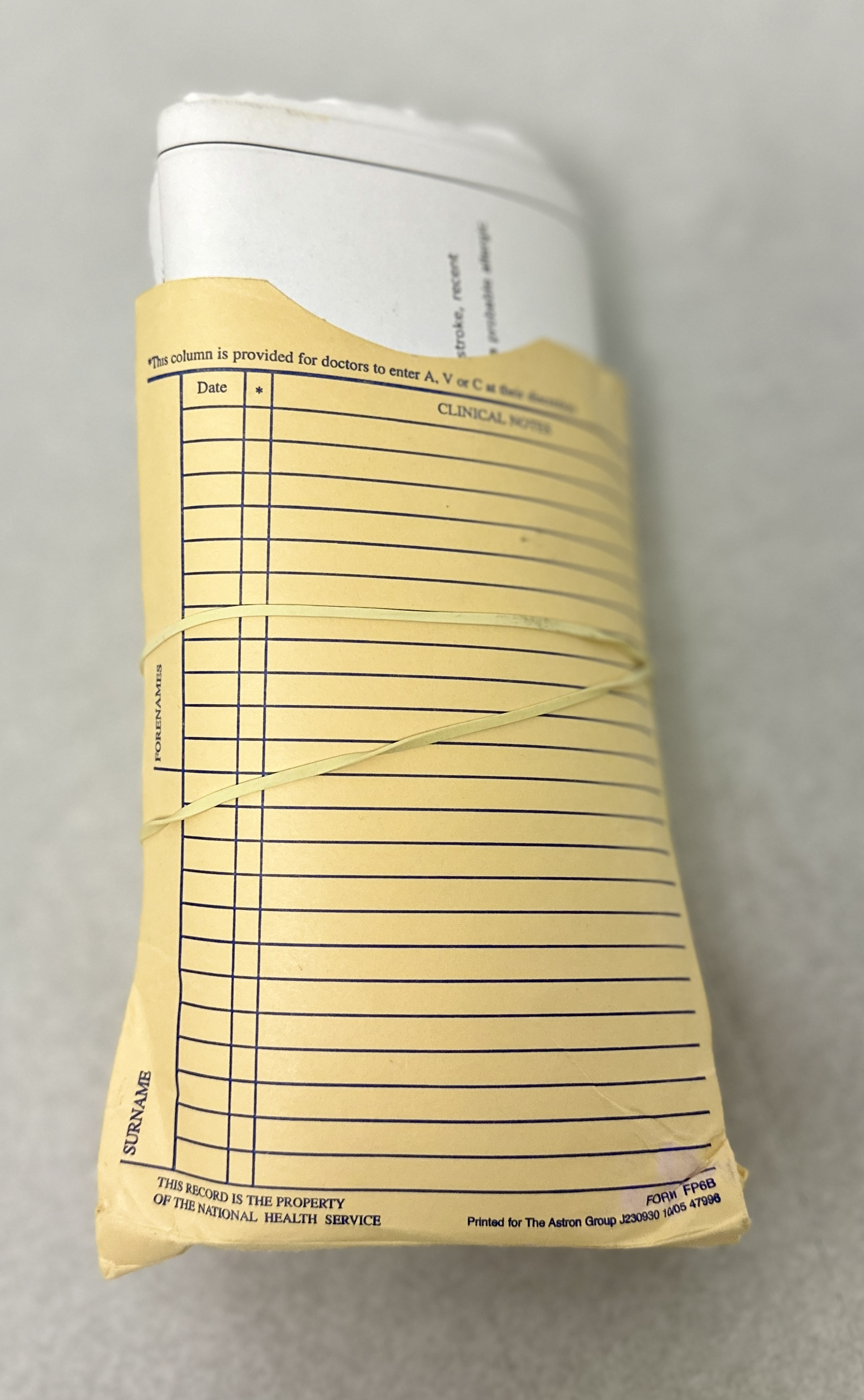
Lloyd George envelopes held by rubber band

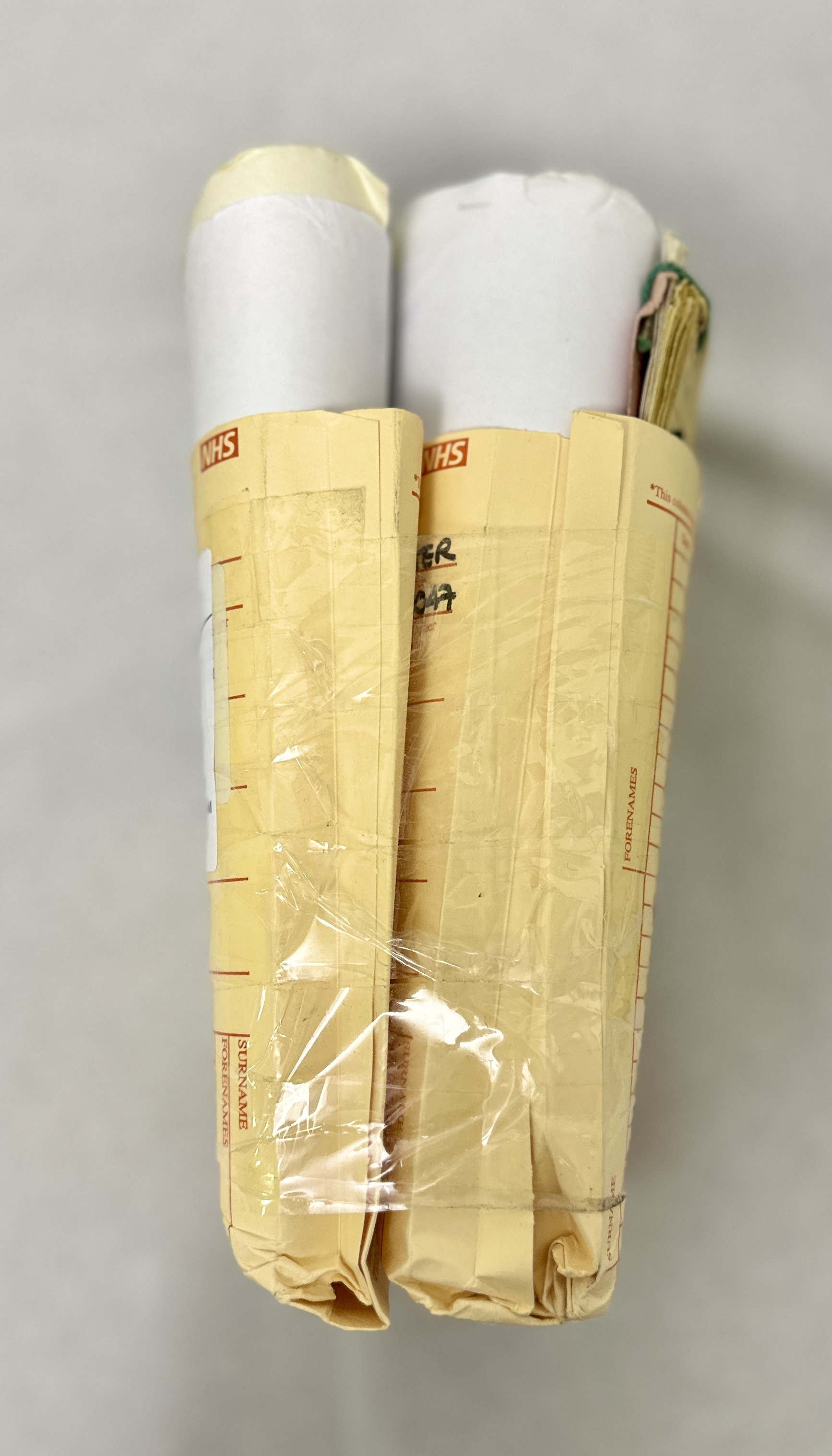
Lloyd George envelopes held by Sellotape
