= Professional Record Standards Body =

The Professional Record Standards Body was established in the United Kingdom in April 2013 by the Academy of Medical Royal Colleges. Its members are organisations representing those who receive and provide health and social care across the UK, as well as those providing the Information Technology systems. Professor Reecha Sofat is the Chair and Oliver Lake is the CEO.

In November 2017 it produced standards setting out what information from screening tests, immunisations and other developmental milestones can be accessed by health and social professionals, parents and guardians.

It awarded its first quality mark for conformance to core information standards to Orion Health in September 2022.

In October 2022 it published a report extending its shared care record standards to pharmacy, optometry, dentistry, ambulance and community services.
