= KMEHR =

KMEHR or Kind Messages for Electronic Healthcare Record is a Belgian medical data standard introduced in 2002, designed to enable the exchange of structured clinical information. It is funded by the Belgian federal Ministry of public health and assessed in collaboration with Belgian industry.

The initiative lead to the specification of about 20 specific XML messages (the Kind Messages for Electronic Healthcare Records - Belgian implementation standard or KMEHR-bis).

== Structure ==
The KMEHR standard consists of an XML (eXtensible Markup Language) message format defined by the KMEHR XML Schema, a set of reference tables and a set of recognized medical transactions compliant with this grammar.

=== Message structure ===
A KMEHR XML message is composed of two components: a header and at least one folder. The header of the message describes the sender, the recipient(s) and a few technical statuses.

The folder itself gathers the information about a patient, where each folder identifies the subject of care (patient) and contains at least one medical transaction.

The medical transaction item gathers the information reported by one healthcare professional at a given instance. Its attributes are type, author, date and time.

== Summarized Electronic Health Record ==
Summarized Electronic Health Record (SumEHR) is a KMEHR message, used for the exchange of medical information. It summarizes the minimal set of data that a physician needs in order to understand the medical status of the patient in a few minutes and to ensure the continuity of care. The SumEHR standard was introduced by the Belgian government in 2005 and an EMD software package used by a physician (GP) should be capable of exporting a SumEHR message (KMEHR message level 4) for any given patient.

=== Coding ===
The KMEHR-bis standard comprises a set of dictionaries which define the transaction types, heading types, item types, severity levels and administration routes.

== Object linkage ==
The KMEHR-bis standard supports links to either internal or external objects, e.g. an image or another KMEHR-message.

=== Services ===
The KMEHR-Bis specification is extended with web services (based on SOAP), which define request and response elements to offer standard web services.

== See also ==
- Belgian Health Telematics Commission (BHTC)
- FLOW
- Electronic health record (EHR)
- Health Level 7
- Clinical Document Architecture (CDA)
- Clinical Data Interchange Standards Consortium (CDISC)

== Sources ==
- KMEHR: Kind Messages for Electronic Healthcare Record, Belgian Implementation Standard
