= Roberto Viola (civil servant) =

Italian engineer and European Commission civil servant

Roberto Viola (born 1958) is a European civil servant from Italy.

Since 2015, he has been the Director General of Directorate-General for Communications Networks, Content and Technology (DG Connect), the European Commission department responsible for developing policies and funding programs that support digital technologies and online services across Europe.

== Education ==
From 1978 to 1983, Viola studied at the Sapienza University of Rome, Italy, earning a doctorate in electronic engineering and graduating cum laude. From 1993 and 1996 he attended the Open University in the UK, graduating with a Master's degree in Business Administration.

== Career ==
After completing his doctorate, Viola worked briefly in telecommunications. He joined the European Space Agency in 1985, where he led telecommunications and satellite broadcasting services. In 199, he moved to Italy’s telecoms and media regulator, AGCOM, serving as Technical Director and then Secretary-General.

From 2010 to 2013 he chaired the European Radio Spectrum Policy Group and was a member of BEREC and the European Regulatory Group. He joined the European Commission’s DG CONNECT in 2012, rising from Deputy Director-General to Director-General in 2015.

Throughout his career, Viola has been instrumental in shaping EU digital and telecommunications policy. In 2025, he upset colleagues by dictating a set of office rules, including a requirement for juniors to wear a suit, not use laptops and speak only when spoken to at meetings.

== Awards ==
In 1983, Viola was awarded the Marconi prize for the best Italian doctoral thesis in telecommunications. In 1999, Viola was awarded the European Space Agency's inventor medal.

== Personal life ==
Viola's native language is Italian, but he also speaks English, Spanish and Dutch.
