= OpenClinica =

- Written in: Java,
- Operating system: Linux, Windows
- Type: Research software, Clinical trial, CRF software
- Website: www.openclinica.com

OpenClinica is a clinical data management system that is used to collect clinical trial data.

== See also ==
- REDCap
