= ISO/TC 215 =

The ISO/TC 215 is the International Organization for Standardization's (ISO) Technical Committee (TC) on health informatics. TC 215 works on the standardization of Health Information and Communications Technology (ICT), to allow for compatibility and interoperability between independent systems.

== Working Groups ==
ISO TC 215 consists of several Working Groups (WG), each dealing with an aspect of Electronic Health Records (EHR).

== Leadership ==
The Technical Committee Chairs are:

Name	Dates	Country
Peter Treseder	1998-2003	Australia
Yun Sik Kwak	2003-2009	Republic of Korea
Christopher Chute	2010-2015	USA
Michael Glickman	2016-2023	USA
Todd Cooper	2024-	USA

== Standards ==
You can search for published standards and those under development here: https://www.iso.org/committee/54960/x/catalogue/p/0/u/1/w/0/d/0

== See also ==
- Medical record
- Electronic medical record
- International Medical Informatics Association
- Canada Health Infoway
- European Institute for Health Records
- National Resource Center for Health Information Technology
- CEN/TC 251 (European Union)
- Data governance
