= European Institute for Health Records =

EuroRec logo

The European Institute for Health Records or EuroRec Institute is a non-profit organization founded in 2002 as part of the ProRec initiative. On 13 May 2003, the institute was established as a non-profit organization under French law. Current President of EuroRec is Prof. Dipak Kalra. The institute is involved in the promotion of high quality Electronic Health Record systems in the European Union. One of the main missions of the institute is to support, as the European authorised certification body, EHRs certification development, testing and assessment by defining functional and other criteria.

== European projects ==
=== ARGOS ===
The main goal of the ARGOS project was to contribute to creating "Transatlantic Observatory for Meeting Global Health Policy Challenges through ICT-Enabled Solutions" to allow promotion of "Common Methods for Responding to Global eHealth Challenges in the EU and the US". The results are used to provide various users recommendations in sustaining co-ordinated actions. It is important to both Europe and the United States of America because:

- There is a barrier in fostering healthcare globally as citizens travel and migrate
- It will help improve their products to better promote themselves in global markets
- The global experiences will become important information for both Europe and America

Through the challenges of enhancing ehealth strategy development, promoting benefits of consistent strategies and supporting large scale ehealth infrastructure implementations will allow Europe and United States researchers and policy makers gain mutual understanding and learning.

The main topics that were address within this project was; ehealth interoperability an EHR certifications, establishing an approach and identification of indicators of the usage and benefits of ehealth, and aiding clinicians in diagnosis and treatment of rare diseases through human physiology and disease modelling and simulation. However the project has highlighted challenges in establishing competent ehealth informatics staff. There are variations of understanding, qualification and definition of workforce requirements through Europe and The United States.

=== HITCH: Healthcare Interoperability Testing and Conformance Harmonisation ===
HITCH project begun 01/01/10 and ended on the 30/06/11. The objective of this project was to involve major stakeholders in defining and agreeing a roadmap that is essential to the foundation for the Interoperability Conformance Testing of information systems in the field of healthcare. HITCH project aims to propose plans on achieving interoperability conformance testing foundation starting 2011 through evaluating existing approaches and identifying potential gaps in initiatives. The roadmap will identify specific needs in improving processes and tools development that will support research. The roadmap will be tested in real-world settings with healthcare IT applications to determine the next logicals steps in establishing a credibility amongst major stakeholders (vendors, users, patients and authorities).

=== Q-REC: European Quality Labelling and Certification of Electronic Health Record systems (EHRs) ===
The Q-REC project started 01/01/06 and finished on 30/06/08. It is a project that is a Specific Support Action and its objective is to supplement the existing e-Health ERA Co-ordination Project "Towards the establishment of a European e Health Research Area". Its aim is to create a credible, sustainable and efficient means of certifying EHR systems in Europe by concentrating EHR Systems Quality Labeling and Certification Development, Resources for EHR interoperatability, and Benchmarking Services.

Some of the goals stated by Q-REC and EuroREC webpage includes:

EHR Systems Quality Labelling and Certification Development

- Developing a modern report on EHR-Certification Schemas that has been implemented in at least three European countries;
- Completing a Pan-European Requirements Assay;
- Proposing a Labelling Terminology and Functional Profiles for EHRs to be certified;
- Comparing and harmonising the EHR-Certification Procedures at a European level;
- Drafting Model Certification Guidelines and Procedures;
- Planning the Validation of the Guidelines.

Resources for EHR Interoperability

- Producing a register for Conformance Criteria and Guidance Documents for obtaining EHR Certification;
- Establishing EHR Archetypes guidelines and inventory;
- Establishing a registration process for Coding Schemes in Europe (as mandated by CEN/TC 251);
- Providing relevant EHR related standards inventory;

Benchmarking Services

- Defining services that uses benchmarking for Manual for Quality Labelling and Certification;
- Preparing the Business Plan for new EHR-Certification related Services

This project was done with EuroRec institute whose mission was to promote high quality EHRs throughout Europe. Through its networks and its centres acting as platforms along with the collaboration with eHealth ERA consortium and European Health Care Authorities (HCA)/ Ministries groups, EuroRec has provided various methods in assessing the needs and optimal choice methods for quality labelling and certification of EHRs.

=== RIDE: A Roadmap for Interoperability of eHealth Systems in Support of COM 356 with Special Emphasis on Semantic Interoperability ===
RIDE is a project that aims to provide a solid foundation for the action plans of eHealth Communication COM 356. It began on 01/01/06 and ended on 31/12/07. Through research and development into the interoperability of eHealth systems, meaningful recommendations can be made for actions at a European level. The lack of complete harmonisation between clinical practice, terminology and EHR systems have highlighted that there is an unrealistic expectation in developing a single universally clinical data model. Hence the RIDE project objective is to provide a roadmap through focusing on current limitations of policies and strategies in solutions for ehealth interoperability and assessing health's European best practices in regards to providing semantic interoperability.

=== EHR-IMPLEMENT: National policies for EHR Implementation in the European area: social and organizational issues ===
The objective of EHR-IMPLEMENT is to provide best practice, policy and strategic recommendations in the implementation of EHR in Europe. This is done though the collection and analysis of EHR implementations in various countries. Previous EHR projects have always addressed the technological area in EHR. Other commonly overlooked in projects, the EHR-IMPLEMENT will focus the social and organisational on a broad national initiative, as these factor may potentially hinder, if not ruin the EHR implementation.

This project comprised a case study approach and a focused survey at a European level. It aims to analyse and collect information on best practices and elaborate recommendations for policymakers to facilitate EHR into member states.

According to EuroREC, these are the main objectives of the projects:

- Analysis of national policies and strategies for the implementation of EHR
- Conducting a survey regarding policy and action plans for National Implementation of EHR into Member States.
- Investigating EHR users in the implementation process.
- Raising issues of EHR implementation
- Identifying best practices towards EHR implementation in Europe
- Promoting information sharing and mutual learning through supporting the development of a community of scientific experts, technical personnel and National Health System representatives
- Providing results and recommendations of the project amongst stakeholders across Europe

== See also ==
- CEN/TC 251
- Canada Health Infoway
- Centers for Medicare and Medicaid Services (USA)
- Clinical Document Architecture (CDA)
- Directorate-General for Information Society and Media (European Commission)
- EHRcom
- European Federation for Medical Informatics (EFMI)
- European Health Telematics Association (EHTEL)
- European Health Telematics Observatory (EHTO)
- Health Informatics Service Architecture (HISA)
- Health Insurance Portability and Accountability Act (HIPAA, USA)
- Health Level 7
- International Classification of Primary Care (ICPC)
- Kind Messages for Electronic Healthcare Record (KMEHR)
- National Resource Center for Health Information Technology
- openEHR Foundation

== Sources ==
- Iakovidis I, Purcarea O., eHealth in Europe: from Vision to Reality, Stud Health Technol Inform. 2008;134:163-8
- Richardson R., eHealth for Europe, Stud Health Technol Inform. 2003;96:151-6
