= Observational Health Data Sciences and Informatics =

Observational Health Data Sciences and Informatics (OHDSI)
- Abbreviation: OHDSI
- Type: International collaborative
- Purpose: To improve health by empowering a community to collaboratively generate evidence that promotes better health decisions and better care.
- Headquarters: Columbia University
- Region served: International
- Website: www.ohdsi.org

The Observational Health Data Sciences and Informatics, or OHDSI (pronounced "Odyssey") is an international collaborative effort aimed at improving health outcomes through large-scale analytics of health data. The OHDSI effort includes diverse researchers and health databases worldwide, with its central coordinating center located at Columbia University.

The group was derived from the Observational Medical Outcomes Partnership (OMOP), a public-private consortium based in the United States of America, created with the goal of improving the state of observational health data for better drug development, which started in response to the U.S. Food and Drug Administration (FDA) Amendments Act of 2007. OMOP developed a Common Data Model (CDM), standardizing the way observational data is represented. After OMOP ended, this standard started being maintained and updated by OHDSI.

As of November 2025, the most recent CDM is version 5.4 (version 6.0 was defined at some point but later not fully embraced).

== See also ==
- Health informatics
- Open science
- Big data
