= Health Informatics Service Architecture =

The European Committee for Standardization (CEN) Standard Architecture for Healthcare Information Systems (ENV 12967), Health Informatics Service Architecture or HISA is a standard that provides guidance on the development of modular open information technology (IT) systems in the healthcare sector. Broadly, architecture standards outline frameworks which can be used in the development of consistent, coherent applications, databases and workstations. This is done through the definition of hardware and software construction requirements and outlining of protocols for communications. The HISA standard provides a formal standard for a service-oriented architecture (SOA), specific for the requirements of health services, based on the principles of Open Distributed Processing. The HISA standard evolved from previous work on healthcare information systems architecture commenced by Reseau d’Information et de Communication Hospitalier Europeen (RICHE) in 1989, and subsequently built upon by a number of organizations across Europe.

== Development of Health Informatics Service Architecture EN/ISO 12967 ==
The HISA standard was developed by CEN Technical Committee (TC) 251, the technical committee for Health Informatics within the federation of European national standards bodies (CEN). The CEN/TC 251 was made up of four working groups, covering: information models; systems of concepts and terminology; security; and technologies for interoperable communication. Working Group I were responsible for information models and completed the specifications that became the HISA standard. Working Group I worked with experts from across Europe, plus contributors from Australia and the United States in the development and finalization of ENV 12967.

The CEN HISA standard was adopted by the International Organization for Standardization (ISO) in 2009, with the stated aim of ISO 12967 being to provide guidance on:

- the description, planning and development of new electronic health systems; and
- the integration of existing electronic health systems, both intra- and inter-organizationally, through architecture that integrates common data and business logic into middleware, which is then made available throughout whole information systems.

== The Standard ==
EN/ISO 12967 is broken down into three parts: Enterprise Viewpoint; Information Viewpoint; and Computational Viewpoint, all of which deal with different aspects of ensuring service architecture supports openness and vendor-independence.

Part One: Enterprise Viewpoint

The Enterprise Viewpoint component of EN/ISO 12967 provides health services with guidance in describing, planning and developing new IT systems, utilizing an open distributed processing approach. In addition to this it provides direction for the integration of existing information systems, within the one enterprise and across different healthcare organizations. Part one of the standard sets forth the common enterprise-level requirements (e.g. workflows, authorizations) that must be supported through the HISA, which integrates the common data and business logic into a specific architectural layer (i.e. the middleware), accessible throughout the whole information system of the health service.

Part Two: Information Viewpoint

The Information Viewpoint component of EN/ISO 12967 sets forth the fundamental characteristics of the information model to be implemented by the middleware to provide comprehensive, integrated storage of the common enterprise data and to support the fundamental business processes of the healthcare organisation, as defined in ISO 12967 Part One. The specifications were designed to be universally relevant, whilst being sufficiently specific to allow implementers to derive an efficient design of the system for their organisation. This specification does not aim to provide a fixed, complete specification of all possible data that may be necessary for any given health service. It specifies only a set of characteristics, in terms of overall organisation and individual information objects, identified as fundamental and common to all healthcare organizations.

Part Three: Computational Viewpoint

The Computational Viewpoint component of EN/ISO 12967 provides details on the fundamental characteristics of the computational model to be implemented by the middleware, to provide a comprehensive and integrated interface to the common, fundamental business processes of the health service. The computational model, like the information model is designed to be universally relevant, whilst still being sufficiently specific to allow implementers to derive an efficient design of the system for their organisation, irrespective of the specifics of the pre-existing information technology environment in which it will be implemented.

== Use of common services ==
The implementation of a modular, open architecture in healthcare IT systems (as specified by the HISA) relies upon disparate heterogeneous applications interacting and communicating through a middleware layer, made up of common services. In the case of the HISA, these common services are divided into Healthcare-related Common Services and Generic Common Services.

Healthcare-related Common Services (HCS)

Healthcare-related Common Services are those middleware components responsible for supporting the functionalities and information relevant to the healthcare business domain, including subject of care, activities, resources, authorization, health characteristics and concepts.

Generic Common Services (GCS)

Generic Common Services are those middleware components are those middleware components responsible for supporting the generic functionality and information requirements that are non-specific to the healthcare domain, and may be broadly relevant to any information system in the business domain.

== See also ==
- Archetype (information science)
- Clinical Document Architecture (CDA)
- Clinical Data Interchange Standards Consortium (CDISC)
- EN 13606
- Electronic Health Record (EHR)
- Electronic medical record
- European Institute for Health Records
- Health Level 7
- OpenEHR
- Public Health Information Network
- National E-Health Transition Authority
- Systems Architecture
