= EN 13606 =

Health informatics standard

- Health informatics - Electronic Health Record Communication
- Related standards: ISO 13606-5:2010
- Website: www.en13606.org

The Health informatics - Electronic Health Record Communication (EN 13606) was the European Standard for an information architecture to communicate patients' electronic health records (EHRs). The standard was later adopted as ISO 13606 and later replaced with ISO 13606-2 and recently ISO 13606-5:2010.

This standard was intended to support the interoperability of systems and components that need to communicate (access, transfer, add or modify) EHR data via electronic messages or as distributed objects:

- preserving the original clinical meaning intended by the author;
- reflecting the confidentiality of that data as intended by the author and patient.

== See also ==
- Clinical Document Architecture (CDA)
- Clinical Data Interchange Standards Consortium (CDISC)
- Continuity of Care Record
- European Institute for Health Records
- Health Informatics Service Architecture (HISA)
