= Mukesh Haikerwal =

Australian Medical Practitioner

Mukesh Haikerwal AC
- Born: Mukesh Chandra Haikerwal; 28 December 1960 (age 65); Lucknow, Uttar Pradesh, India
- Citizenship: Australian
- Education: Leicester University
- Medical career
- Profession: General practitioner

Mukesh Chandra Haikerwal AC (born 28 December 1960) is a British-Australian medical doctor practising in Melbourne. From 2005 to 2007, he was the Federal President of the Australian Medical Association (AMA), and in 2011 became a Companion of the Order of Australia. Through his involvement in several not-for-profit organisations, Haikerwal is a strong advocate for better working conditions for medical staff. Early in 2020, Haikerwal coordinated and led ongoing lobbying for the provision of adequate supplies of protective equipment for those dealing with COVID-19 pandemic.

== Early life and education ==
The child of Indian-born British citizens who were working for the UN in Nigeria, Haikerwal, born in Lucknow, India, was sent to a London boarding school at the age of six. In 1981, the year he started medical school in the English city of Leicester, his mother left for Australia to join his father who had migrated the year before. In 1990, Haikerwal, by then married, arrived in Melbourne and set up the Altona North Medical Practice where he worked until it was recently sold to a private equity firm.

== Medical career ==
Haikerwal was employed for some time as a doctor at Leicester General Hospital. Haikerwal travelled to Australia in 1982 to visit his family and the country. Eight years later, he emigrated permanently and set up a general practice in Melbourne's western suburbs, where he still works. He is a professor in the School of Medicine at Flinders University and a director at Brain Injury Australia. In 2020, Haikerwal was appointed as an Honorary Enterprise Professor at The University of Melbourne taking a lead role as Clinical Chief Investigator in a research programme, Future Health Today which has the aim of detecting chronic disease earlier in people at risk. In 2025, Haikerwal sold his Altona North medical practice, and retired from general practice.

== Associations ==
He has held several roles within the Australian Medical Association (AMA), elected vice-president of the Victorian branch in 1998; Victorian branch president in 2001; moving to federal vice-president before taking on the role of federal president between 2005 and 2007.

Haikerwal is an advisor for Her Heart, a not-for-profit focused on the prevention of women's heart disease, and was Chair of the Beyond Blue National Doctors' Mental Health Program from 2015 to 2021. In April 2011, he was appointed Chair of the World Medical Association. He works with Cancer Victoria to improve advocacy and knowledge of cancer, cancer care, and facilities.

The Australian Minister of Health, Peter Dutton, announced in July 2014 the appointment of Haikerwal as Chair of the Australian Institute of Health and Welfare, a statutory agency with a role of providing reliable health data to the Australian and Government and public.

== Advocacy ==
=== Better working conditions ===
From early in his career Haikerwal has advocated for better conditions for medical staff. As a representative of junior doctors in the Southern Trent Region of England, he facilitated a meeting in 1989 with Members of Parliament to discuss concerns about the long hours of work. Haikerwal told the meeting that doctors were commonly working 72 hours a week, or longer, [making]..."life or death decisions when sometimes [they] are too tired to talk properly." The doctors used various publicity stunts to draw public attention to the issues, which Haikerwal described as being mostly the risk to patient safety. He said it was about "changing some practices and organising time better", in the context of Regional Health Authorities guidelines being that "junior doctors should not work more than 104 hours a week, or 48 hour continuously." By June 1990 a move to have a survey on social action for a shorter week was approved by the British Medical Association junior doctors committee, and on 2 July 1990, it was confirmed that authorised surveys would be sent out to all junior doctors in England to discover if they were prepared to take industrial action. Recalling his time at Leicester General Hospital, he later told The Age newspaper: "If you want someone to work hard, pay them properly and give them good conditions. If you've got doctors that are working and happy, they'll do a better job. And the patients will benefit at the end of the day, too."

=== Health and safety of medical staff ===
When a gunman shot and killed a security guard in 2001 after storming into an abortion clinic in Australia, while an anti-abortion group was demonstrating nearby, Haikerwal expressed concern that this reflected growing levels of violence against any medical staff, "whether at hospitals, private clinics or other health-related clinics."

In his role as President of the Australian Medical Association Haikerwal campaigned for improvements in how emotional trauma for young doctors is managed. The suicide of a trainee surgeon in Australia in 2006 highlighted the emotional stresses placed upon doctors and Haikerwal said that a survey of junior doctors on the numbers of hours they worked had not shown much improvement since a survey conducted four years previously. He concluded that "there has to be a reasonable expectation of reasonable life, doing what is doing a very impassioned career, looking after people...[with the promotion of]...a more supportive, nurturing way of looking after all of us within the profession."

=== eHealth ===
Haikerwal is an advocate for the responsible use of digital technologies to manage medical data on behalf of doctors and patients. Between 2007 and 2013 in his role as an eHealth Head of Clinical Leadership and Stakeholder Management on the Australian National E-Health Transition Authority (NEHTA) he had a major role in implementing the Personally Controlled Electronic Health Record System (PCEHR). In 2010 Haikerwal co-authored a paper in the Medical Journal of Australia that critically examined the implementation of e-health in Australia at the time. The authors noted the benefits of the system to patients following government funding and legislation, but identified that due to hospitals generally not being adequately computerized, there was a lack of coordination in securely sharing patient data, [and]..."to ensure the clinical relevance, utility, safety and acceptability of e-health systems, health professionals urgently need technical capacity and expert guidance." When Haikerwal resigned from his position at NEHTA in August 2013, the Australian Medical Association President said it is raised concerns about a lack of consultation with doctors in the PCEHR implementation process, noting that this was "the sort of expertise that Dr Haikerwal and his colleagues brought to NEHTA and the whole e-health sector." Haikerwal however, said that his decision to move on was appropriate because the eHealth systems were now being "tweaked to encompass utility, usability, usefulness and meaningful use in the products to be rolled out into the healthcare sector...[and]...I believe eHealth and the PCEHR will be the way of the future and I will continue to encourage my patients and my clinical colleagues to consider taking advantage of the benefits of these systems." Peter Flemming, CEO at NEHTA explained that discussions he had with Haikerwal [aligned]..."with NEHTA’s shift in focus from designing and building national eHealth infrastructure to implementing and supporting adoption of eHealth...[acknowledging that]...Mukesh brought to NEHTA the advocacy for a clinically led national eHealth programme and built a strong network of clinical leads who are experts across the entire Australian clinical landscape."

=== COVID-19 ===
Early in the COVID-19 pandemic in Australia, Haikerwal advocated for rigorous testing procedures and turned the car park of his family physician office into a government-sponsored respiratory clinic. He took a strong lead coordinating doctors in Melbourne to deal with technological issues related to systems for tracing the spread of the virus, and has continued to speak freely about the challenges faced by staff on the frontline, particularly with regard to getting adequate supplies of personal protective equipment (PPE).

== Honours ==
On 1 January 2001, he was granted the Centenary Medal for service to medicine. In the Australia Day Honours in 2011, Haikerwal was made an Officer of the Order of Australia for "distinguished service to medical administration, to the promotion of public health through leadership roles with professional organisations, particularly the Australian Medical Association, to the reform of the Australian health system through the optimisation of information technology, and as a general practitioner". In 2018, he was upgraded to a Companion of the Order of Australia, Australia's highest civilian honour, for "eminent service to medical governance, administration, and technology, and to medicine, through leadership roles with a range of organisations, to education and the not-for-profit sector, and to the community of western Melbourne".

== Personal life ==
Haikerwal is married to Karyn Alexander, who is also a doctor and they have three sons Ajaya, Suresh, and Jeevan.

On 27 September 2008, Haikerwal was assaulted and robbed by five men near Dennis Reserve in Williamstown, Victoria. Haikerwal sustained serious head injuries in the attack, and was in a coma for 24 hours, remaining in hospital for two months. Haikerwal recalls trying to reason with the youths who assaulted him, but has no memory of the actual blow to the head. However, he quickly realised the potential of a bleed in his brain and managed to call his wife, and with the assistance of a nearby police officer and his brother Dr Deepak Haikerwal, a cardiologist, was able to get to hospital. He underwent emergency brain surgery to remove two blood clots from his brain and suffered an injury which required him to learn how to walk and talk again. He was transferred to Epworth Hospital's in-patient rehabilitation centre, where he underwent a "five-week program of intense physiotherapy and speech therapy, after which he was talking and walking as before." When one of the attackers was not deported to his home country, Haikerwal said he supported the decision in principle, but expressed some concerns whether victims' interests were being carefully considered in these cases. The prison sentences the attackers received are said to have given Haikerwal little comfort but he commented [that while]..."violence is something we cannot tolerate in our community...I think [this sentence] shows police have investigated and police work is seen to have some value."
