= Healthcare in Lincolnshire =

Healthcare in Lincolnshire was, until July 2022, the responsibility of integrated care systems covering Lincolnshire West, Lincolnshire East, North East Lincolnshire, North Lincolnshire, and South Lincolnshire.

In 2023, the Lincolnshire mental health hospital was found inadequate, dirty and unsafe after inspectors visited the hospital. Care Quality Commission inspected the hospital regarding concerns by the police and the public and service users. There are also reports that people experienced physical assaults by the staff and they are also involving the police, although, CQC was not informed. It was also found that there were not enough registered mental nurses.

== History ==
From 1947 to 1974 NHS services in Lincolnshire were managed by the Sheffield Regional Hospital Board. In 1974 the boards were abolished and replaced by regional health authorities. Leicestershire came under the Trent RHA. From 1974 there were two area health authorities, North and South covering the county. From 1982 there was one district health authority. Five primary care trusts were established in the county in 2002: East Lincolnshire, Lincolnshire South West Teaching PCT and West Lincolnshire, North Lincolnshire and North East Lincolnshire Care Trust Plus. East Lincolnshire, Lincolnshire South West Teaching PCT and West Lincolnshire were merged in 2006. They were managed by the North and East Yorkshire and Northern Lincolnshire Strategic Health Authority and East Midlands Strategic Health Authority.

== Sustainability and transformation plans ==
In March 2016 Allan Kitt the Chief Officer of South West Lincolnshire Clinical Commissioning Group was appointed the leader of the Lincolnshire Sustainability and transformation plan footprint. It was proposed to downgrade Grantham A&E to an urgent care centre. Critical care, vascular surgery, ‘hyper acute’ stroke services and emergency paediatrics were to be centralised in Lincoln and there was to be a reduction of 750 full-time healthcare posts across the county by 2021.

In 2018, the STP signed a deal with Cambio Healthcare Systems for real-time dashboards, using the company's Patient Flow Manager product to help forecast capacity and demand in November 2018. This would be made available to all the health and care organisations in the STP.

== Commissioning ==
In July 2017 it was announced that North East Lincolnshire Council and the clinical commissioning group would have a joint chief executive.

== Primary care ==
Out-of-hours services are provided by Allied Health South Lincolnshire, which is a GP federation, the Lincolnshire Out of Hours service and the GP-led Urgent Treatment Centres at Scunthorpe General Hospital, Louth Hospital, Boston Pilgrim Hospital, Lincoln County Hospital, Stamford Hospital and Skegness Hospital.

== Acute services ==
Northern Lincolnshire and Goole Hospitals NHS Foundation Trust, North West Anglia NHS Foundation Trust and United Lincolnshire Hospitals NHS Trust run hospitals.

In 2020 it was reported that ambulance response times for category 2 calls, which include heart attacks and strokes, in rural East Lincolnshire were poor with 10% of callers having to wait around 90 minutes, against a target of 18 minutes. The integrated care system produced a document in 2022 saying that they did not currently have a robust response approach to ambulance handover delays, which were some of the worst in England.

== Mental health and community services ==
Mental health services are provided by Lincolnshire Partnership NHS Foundation Trust and NAViGO Health and Social Care CIC, while community services are provided by Lincolnshire Community Health Services.
