= Grantham and District Hospital =

- United Lincolnshire Hospitals NHS Trust
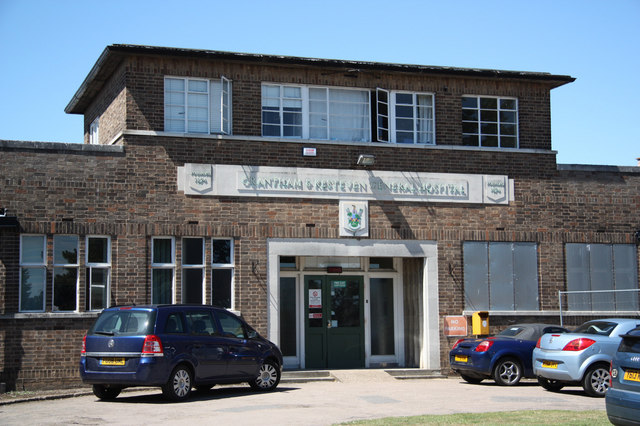
- Grantham and District Hospital

- Shown in Grantham

Geography
- Location: 101 Manthorpe Rd, Grantham, NG31 8DG, Lincolnshire, England
- Coordinates: 52.92095°N 0.64187°W

Organisation
- Care system: NHS
- Type: District General
- Affiliated university: Lincolnshire PCT

Services
- Emergency department: Yes
- Beds: 184

History
- Founded: 1874

Links
- Website: www.ulh.nhs.uk
- Lists: Hospitals in England

Grantham and District Hospital, is an NHS hospital in Grantham, Lincolnshire, England. It is managed by United Lincolnshire Hospitals NHS Trust.

== History ==
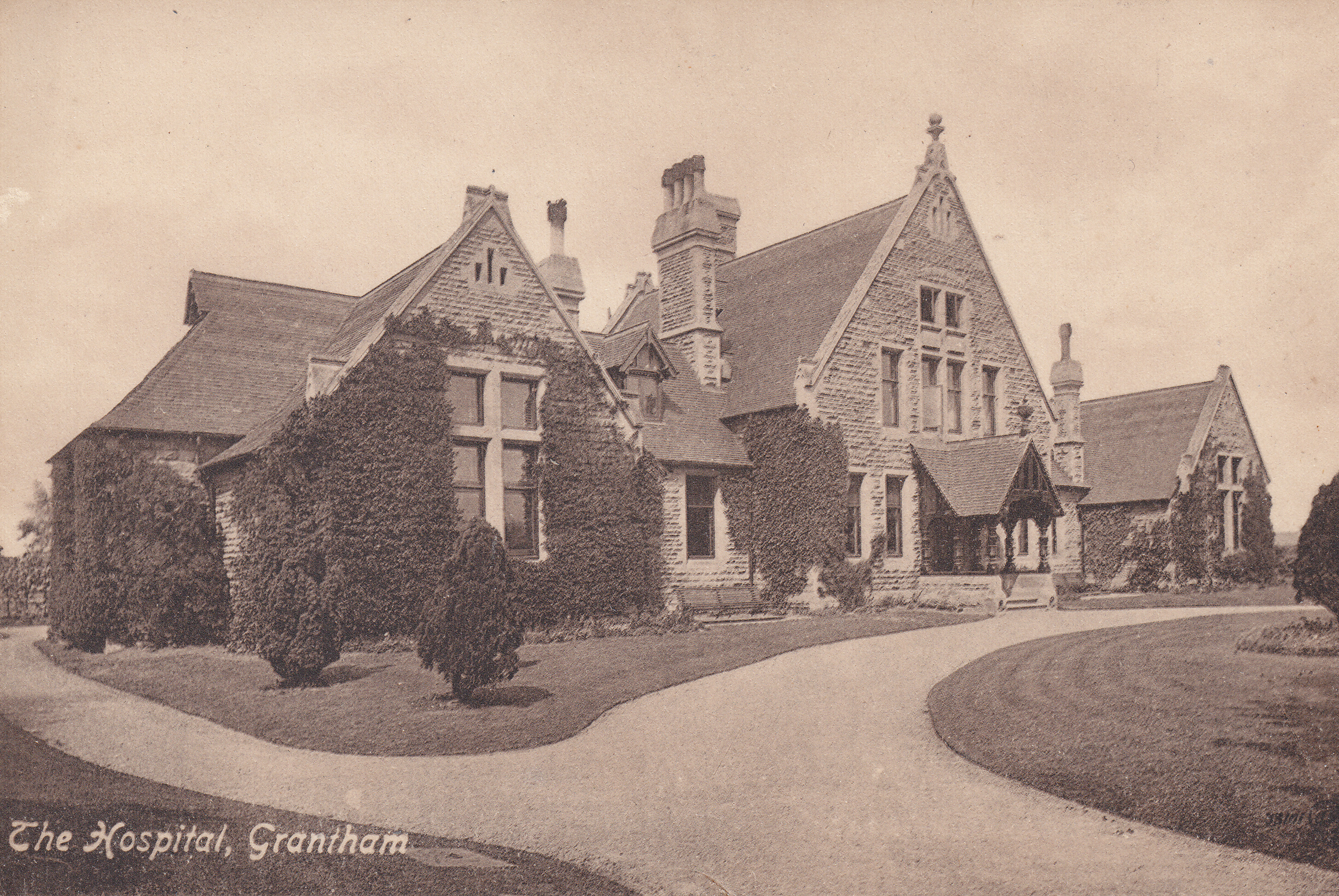
The hospital c.1900

The foundation stone for the Grantham and Kesteven Hospital was laid on 29 October 1874. It was designed by Richard Adolphus Came and was officially opened by Lady Brownlow on 5 January 1876. An extension to a design by F. J. Lenton involving veranda type ward blocks was completed in 1935 and, after the hospital had joined the National Health Service in 1948, a new maternity department was added in 1972.

The hospital achieved notoriety when nurse Beverley Allitt was convicted of killing four young patients and harming nine others with injections in the early 1990s.

Due to low number of mothers having babies in Grantham, the trust decided to close the birthing unit in February 2014.

The hospital had 24-hour accident and emergency facilities until July 2016 when the trust decided to close it temporarily from 6.30 pm to 9 am as they did not have enough doctors. Attendance at the A&E fell from 80 a day to 60, and admissions to the hospital fell from 14 a day to 12. A march in protest at the closure attracted 6,000 people on 29 October 2016, complaining that it was 35 miles to the nearest A&E.

The United Lincolnshire Hospitals NHS Trust proposed demolishing the 1874 hospital building in 2014 to replace it with a car park. This did not occur but the building has since been left abandoned and deteriorating. The trust renewed efforts to demolish the building in 2021 citing "safety and visual impact" concerns. A local campaign was begun to petition for the saving of the structure, which Private Eye described as "the most impressive and interesting building on the site".

In 2020 the emergency department at the hospital was temporarily closed. In April 2021 a judicial review at the High Court ruled that the United Lincolnshire Hospitals NHS Trust did not consult properly on their plans for a 'green site' there, because they thought there would be too much resistance to it. Local campaigners were incensed.

=== Maternity unit ===
50 maternity beds were planned in 1964, to be built by 1966; previously there were 12 beds at the hospital and 12 maternity beds at the Hill View hospital.

== Visits ==
Queen Elizabeth The Queen Mother visited the hospital on 26 June 1963.

== See also ==
- Healthcare in Lincolnshire
