= John Coupland Hospital =

- Lincolnshire Community Health Services
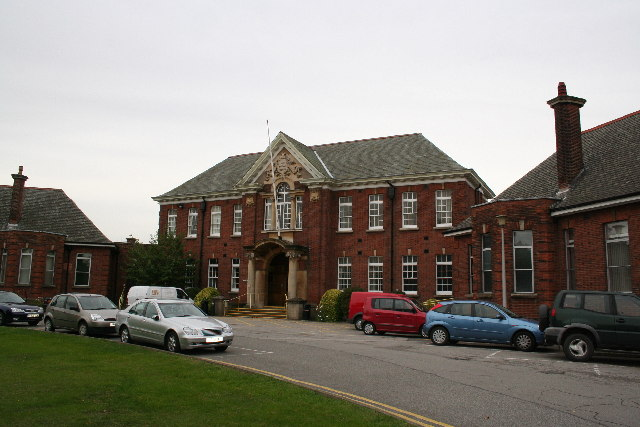
- John Coupland Hospital

- Shown in Lincolnshire

Geography
- Location: Ropery Road, Gainsborough, Lincolnshire, England
- Coordinates: 53.4118°N 0.7847°W

Organisation
- Care system: NHS England
- Type: Community

Services
- Emergency department: Urgent Treatment Centre (08:00-22:00)

History
- Founded: 1913

Links
- Website: www.ulh.nhs.uk

John Coupland Hospital is a healthcare facility in Ropery Road, Gainsborough, Lincolnshire, England. It is managed by Lincolnshire Community Health Services.

== History ==
The facility, which was founded by George Coupland in memory of his father John Coupland, was built in the Georgian style and opened on 24 September 1913. It treated British and Belgian military casualties during the First World War. It joined the National Health Service in 1948 and a major programme of fire protection works was carried out at the hospital in December 2017.
