= Lincoln County Hospital =

Coordinates: 53.2333°N 0.518775°W

- United Lincolnshire Hospitals NHS Trust
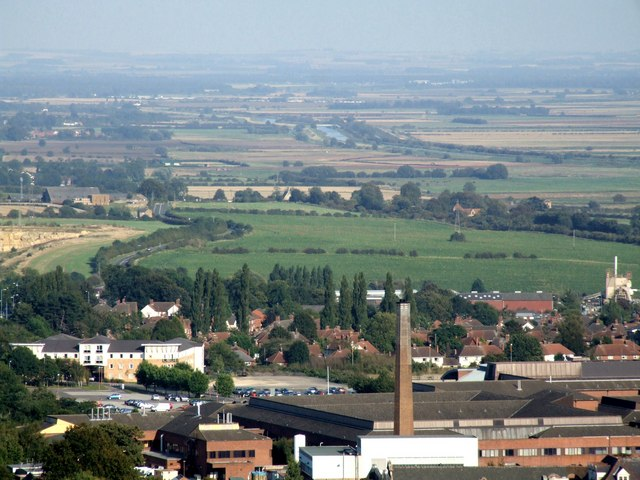
- East side of the hospital seen from Lincoln Cathedral

- Shown in Lincolnshire

Geography
- Location: Greetwell Road, Lincoln, Lincolnshire, England

Organisation
- Care system: NHS England
- Type: District General
- Affiliated university: University of Nottingham

Services
- Emergency department: Yes
- Beds: 602

History
- Founded: 1776

Links
- Website: www.ulh.nhs.uk/hospitals/lincoln-county
- Lists: Hospitals in England

Lincoln County Hospital is a large district general hospital on the eastern edge of north-east Lincoln, England. It is the largest hospital in Lincolnshire, and offers the most comprehensive services in Lincolnshire. It is managed by the United Lincolnshire Hospitals NHS Trust.

== History ==
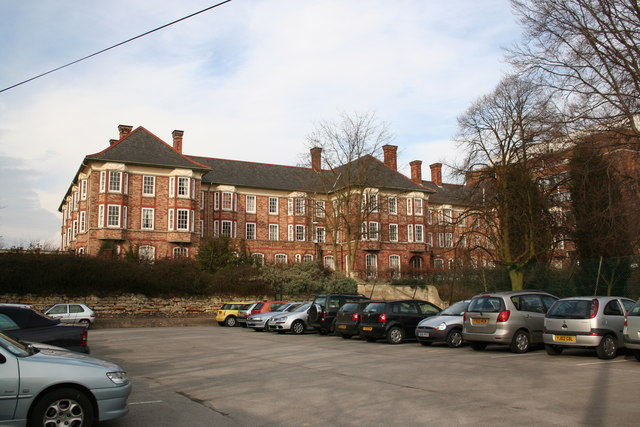
Hospital buildings dating back to 1878

=== Early history ===
The hospital has its origins in some rented accommodation in St Swithin's which opened in November 1769. A purpose-built facility was designed by John Carr and William Lumby and built in Drury Lane between 1776 and 1777.

Following issues with the nursing care, the Ladies' Nursing Fund Committee was established in 1864 to provide a better quality of nursing staff to the hospital. This arrangement only lasted for three years, but the Bromhead Institution for Nurses and the Bromhead Nursing Home became well established in Lincoln.

A new site was identified on Sewell Road and purchased in 1875. A new building, designed by Alexander Graham, was built on the new site and completed in 1878. The hospital joined the National Health Service in 1948.

=== Construction ===
Charles Pelham, 4th Earl of Yarborough opened a new X-ray department on Friday 7 April 1922.

In the late 1930s £100,000 of buildings were added in two stages. The first stage cost £57,000, completed by April 1939.

Construction work, undertaken by Shepherd Building Group on a maternity unit commenced on site on 2 May 1966. It involved 112 beds, including 78 consultant beds, 26 general practitioner beds, and eight private patients beds. There was also a delivery suite. The unit had a special care unit with 21 cots on the sixth floor, an ante-natal clinic, and midwifery training school on the ground floor. The total cost was £800,000. The seven-storey maternity unit was opened by Princess Margaret, Countess of Snowdon on 4 December 1968, who later visited Scunthorpe.

Construction of phase one of the main hospital, undertaken by Shepherd Building Group, began at the end of July 1981. There were two main buildings, with 112 beds. Phase one cost £16.7m and involved four new operating theatres. Some 150 more staff were needed, with one hundred more nurses. At the time, it was difficult to find enough experienced theatre staff. It opened to the public in April 1985, after ward staff and theatre staff moved from St George's Hospital. Phase one was officially opened on the morning of 23 July 1985 by Diana, Princess of Wales. Diana had arrived at RAF Scampton in a Hawker Siddeley Andover, with two thousand people lining the route from Scampton. Diana later visited North Hykeham in the afternoon.

Construction of Phase Two of the hospital, undertaken by Higgs and Hill Northern, started on 7 December 1989. It involved a series of surgical wards, six operating theatres, and a new A&E. There were 168 new acute beds. Phase two was completed at a cost of £24 million. It partly opened to the public in mid-February 1993 and fully opened to the public in April 1993. It was officially opened by Princess Anne on the afternoon of 15 September 1993, having earlier visited Willoughby, Lincolnshire and North Somercotes.

The Lincolnshire Department of Oncology was opened by Princess Alexandra on the afternoon of Wednesday October 10 2001.

The Princess Royal opened a new extension on the afternoon of Wednesday 16 March 2005, after earlier visiting Hough-on-the-Hill and Sleaford.

=== Recent history ===
The Lincoln Hospitals' Radio Service, which first broadcast from St George's Hospital in December 1979, moved to Lincoln County Hospital in 1988. Its founder, Ray Drury, had been a cartoonist with the Daily Express.

On 5 November 1975, 10 year old Stephen Jackson-Parr, of Mayfield Avenue in Gainsborough, was admitted to the hospital after being seriously mauled by a circus lion that had escaped near Ropery Road. He was found almost naked, his shirt having been ripped from his back. Four lions from Robert Brothers Circus had escaped. The boy was at a nearby bonfire. The lions were tracked down and shot with tranquilliser darts. The day before, a worker at a safari park, 22 year old Sidney Bamford, had been killed by a tiger called Yellow Tag. The matter was raised in parliament on 10 November 1975 by Marcus Kimball the local Member of Parliament. Stephen was seriously ill for many days in the intensive care unit, and died on 20 November 1975.

On 14 July 1977, 50 children were admitted to the hospital when a crop sprayer aircraft had mistakenly flown over Branston County Junior School playground, spraying Systox and Aphox.

On 21 August 1987, Lynn Eyre, of Tobruk Close, gave birth to quadruplets, three boys and a girl.

In January 2008, there was an outbreak of norovirus, known as the 'vomiting bug'; an outbreak also occurred at the Pilgrim Hospital.

In 2013, a review by Professor Sir Bruce Keogh found that there was a significant backlog of complaints and that there had been a noticeable increase in incidents when the ombudsman had to intervene to investigate complaints that had not been followed up. Accordingly Keogh found that the complaints handling system was not fit for purpose. The trust implemented a new complaints system in response.

== Notable staff ==
- Cassandra Maria Beachcroft (1839–1937), Matron, 1884 to 1898. Beachcroft trained as a Lady Probationer at The London Hospital under Annie Swift and Eva Luckes between about 1879 and 1881. She worked as a ward sister at both The London and St Bartholomew's Hospital before her appointment. She resigned as matron of Lincoln County Hospital after 14 years tenure because of a disagreement with the house surgeon over her professional autonomy. She was an early member of the British Nurses' Association and also a vice Chairman of the Matron's Council.
- Janet A. Sheppard, Matron 1911 to 1934. She was one of twenty nurses sent from The London Hospital to nurse typhoid patients during the 1905 Lincoln typhoid epidemic.

== Services ==
The University of Nottingham Medical School has approximately 330 nursing students and 30 midwifery students at its Lincoln Education Centre. Lincolnshire and Nottinghamshire share the Lincolnshire & Nottinghamshire Air Ambulance.
