= Tim Kelsey =

English-Australian business executive

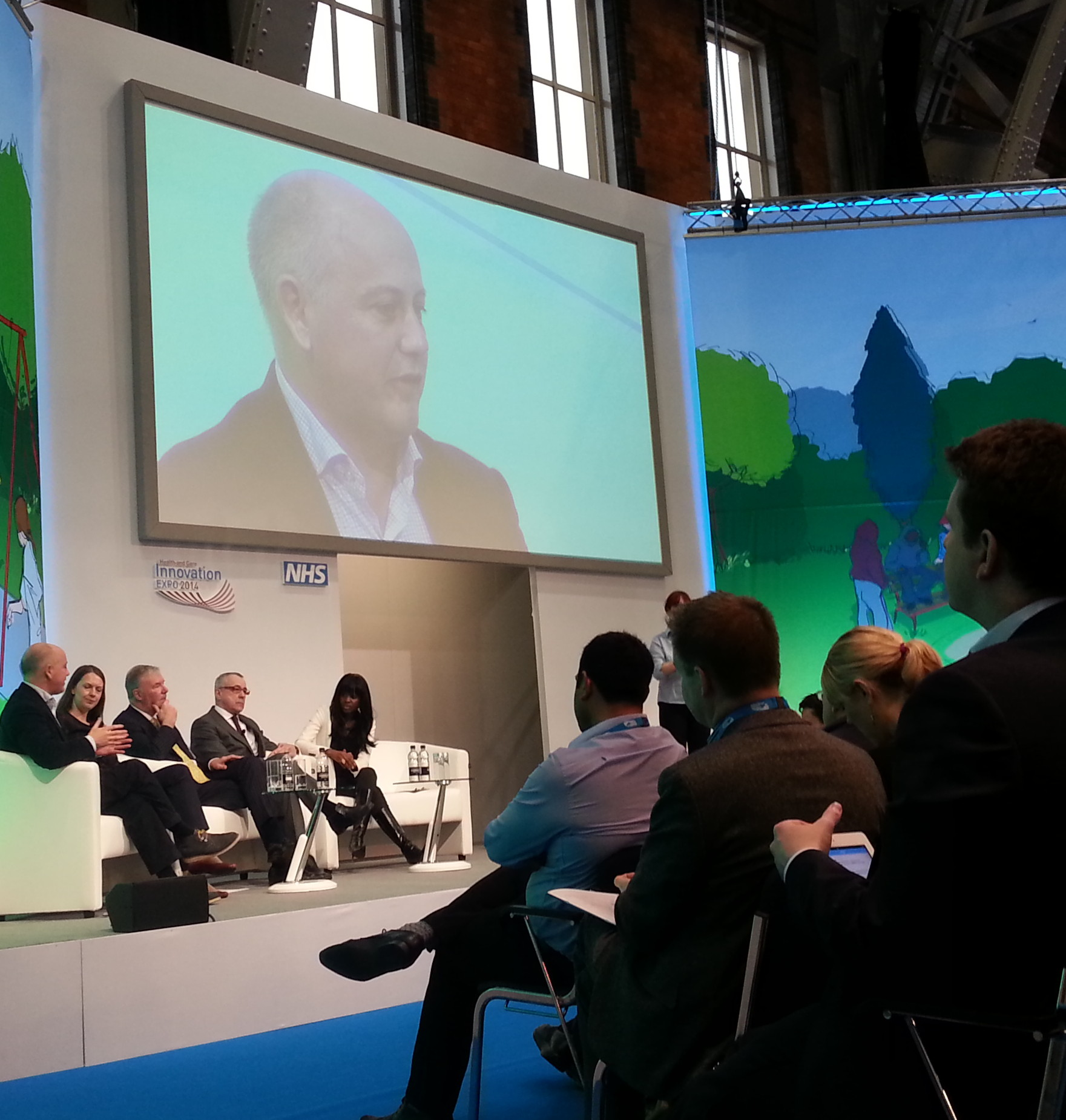
- Conference presentation 2014

Managing Director, Hunter Healthcare
- Incumbent
- Assumed office September 2025

Personal details
- Born: Welwyn Garden City, Hertfordshire, U.K.
- Education: Magdalene College, Cambridge

Tim Kelsey is an English-Australian business executive. He is Managing Director of Hunter Healthcare, an international health company. He was appointed in September 2025.

He was formerly CEO of Beamtree, (formerly PKS), an Australian health technology company (ASX:BMT)

Previously, he was inaugural chief executive of the Australian Digital Health Agency. In 2018, he co-founded and was appointed chair of the Global Digital Health Partnership, which brings 21 countries and the World Health Organization together in a collaboration to support implementation of digital health services worldwide.

He was previously the first National Director for Patients and Information in NHS England. The role - which he served between 2012 and 2015 - combined the functions of chief technology and information officer with responsibility for patient and public participation and communications. Before his appointment in July 2012, he was the United Kingdom government's Executive Director of Transparency and Open Data leading on the development of national public data policy.

He was appointed National Information Director in health and care and chair, the National Information Board, in April 2014.

He started his career as a journalist and went on to co-found Dr Foster in 2000, an organisation for publishing comparative hospital death rates and other measures of health quality. The Department of Health's acquisition of 50% of Dr Foster in 2006 was strongly criticised by the House of Commons Public Accounts Committee, which described it as "favouritism" and a "hole and corner deal".

Kelsey is an activist for transparency and digital empowerment in public services. He was appointed visiting professor at the Institute of Global Health Innovation, Imperial College London in November 2015 and is co-author with Roger Taylor of "Transparency and the Open Society", which makes the case for transparency in public services and argues that it improves social and economic equity. It was published in June 2016 by Policy Press and the University of Chicago.

In 2007, Kelsey was the architect and launch programme director of NHS Choices. He has also worked for HIMSS, Telstra, the Australian telecoms company, and for McKinsey & Company.

== Early career and education ==
He was educated at Wellington College, Berkshire, between 1978 and 1983. In 1984, he won an Exhibition to study history at Magdalene College, Cambridge. After graduating in 1987, Kelsey worked as a freelance newspaper and radio journalist in Turkey and Iraq for The Independent, BBC and The Sunday Telegraph. His investigation into illicit kidney trafficking between Istanbul and London in 1989 triggered a change in British law. He also documented the use of chemical weapons against civilians during Saddam Hussein's campaign against the Kurds in northern Iraq in a series of articles in The Independent. He joined the launch staff of The Independent on Sunday in 1989 and covered the 1990 Gulf War as a combat pool reporter with British forces. During this period he also presented a number of TV documentaries including "Frontline" for Channel 4 (1994), a documentary in which he escorted Queenie Fletcher, mother of murdered policewoman Yvonne Fletcher to confront Col Gaddafi in Libya and "You Only Live Once" for the BBC (1996), an investigation into anti-ageing science. In 1995 he joined the Sunday Times and became deputy editor of the Insight Team before being appointed news editor in 1998. Kelsey is author of Dervish: The Invention of Modern Turkey, a portrait of the country in the mid-1990s which was published by Hamish Hamilton in 1996 and Penguin Books the following year. Jan Morris, the noted travel writer, commented in her jacket review: 'An excellent travel book, offering startling and vivid insights, social, historical and political, into a Turkey that most visitors can hardly imagine.' Others described it as 'dystopian' and 'no standard travel narrative'.

== Dr Foster ==
In 1999, Kelsey, then news editor at the Sunday Times, founded Dr Foster with Roger Taylor, a former Financial Times journalist, and Roger Killen, a Stanford graduate. The organisation was set up to promote information on the quality of local health services to patients and the public. Kelsey explained his motives in an article in the New Statesman magazine in 2001.

In 2001, Dr Foster – named after an English nursery rhyme character - published the first annual Good Hospital Guide in the Sunday Times. It revealed widespread variation in adjusted death rates between English hospitals and was the first time such a comparative measure of quality had been published for a national health economy. The methodology was developed by Prof Sir Brian Jarman, director of the Dr Foster Unit at Imperial College, London. It prompted widespread media interest and stimulated a national debate over quality in healthcare. Alan Milburn MP, then secretary of state for health, told the BBC in response to the publication: "The NHS has acted like a secret society. It has to recognise that people now expect to be treated like consumers".

The Dr Foster Hospital Guide is published annually and remains an important independent publication on quality in National Health Service (NHS) hospitals. In 2011, it identified a number of underperforming hospitals in England and a higher risk of avoidable mortality at the weekend.

Since 2001, Kelsey has overseen publication of a series of similar consumer guides to individual hospital consultants, maternity services, and complementary therapists among others.

Kelsey was chief executive of Dr Foster between 2000 and 2006 during which time it was reported the 9th fastest growing private company in the UK by the Sunday Times. In 2006, a public body - the NHS Information Centre - purchased 50% of the company and Kelsey became chair of the Executive Board of the new organisation – Dr Foster Intelligence. This public sector investment in a private company was criticised by the National Audit Office on the grounds that it had not been put out to tender. Besides publishing information to the public, Dr Foster Intelligence also provides analytic services to around 85% of NHS hospitals in England and works with health organisations in Europe and the US.

In 2008, Kelsey won the HealthInvestor award for Outstanding Contribution as an Individual to Healthcare for his work with Dr Foster.

In 2006, he was appointed to design the NHS online information service, NHS Choices, by the UK Department of Health. The project, an online information service which publishes comparative data on NHS performance and is designed to promote greater patient choice in healthcare, launched in 2007.

Kelsey was a trustee of the Nuffield Trust, a leading British policy think tank, and a commissioner of the 2020 Public Services Trust. He chaired the 2020 public technology group which published a report arguing for more transparency in public services – Online or Inline – in March 2010.

In 2009, Kelsey was appointed a lay member of the National Quality Board of the NHS.

Kelsey left Dr Foster in May 2010 and joined McKinsey & Co where he led development of information strategies in international public services, based in London.

== Controversy surrounding Department of Health acquisition of Dr Foster ==
The circumstances of the £12m joint venture between Dr Foster, the company co-founded by Tim Kelsey, and the Department of Health, were criticised in an official report from the National Audit Office, following a report by an anonymous whistleblower who raised concerns about the legality of the arrangement.

The acquisition was strongly criticised by the House of Commons Public Accounts Committee. Committee chair Edward Leigh commented "The seeming degree of favouritism in the choice of company and the haste with which the deal was concluded show a disregard for the rules governing the use of public money". Leigh described the Department of Health's acquisition of 50% of Dr Foster as a "hole and corner deal" and said the department may have paid some £4m more than its share was worth. He also claimed that of the £12m paid by the DoH, £7.6m "went straight into the pockets of Dr Foster’s shareholders".

However, the Department and the NHS Information Centre disputed the findings of the NAO, stating: 'Dr Foster Ltd clearly represented the best possible prospect for a joint venture, given the benefits they were seeking to attain... to harness private sector dynamism, efficiency and effectiveness to public sector expertise in the health informatics field'. The Department of Health said it 'acted on advice given by its Commercial Directorate and legal and professional advisers'.

In 2008, the former head of the NHS Information Centre, statistician Denise Lievesley, claimed to an employment tribunal that she had been made a "scapegoat" for the Dr Foster deal in 2007 despite repeatedly highlighting concerns about the joint venture's worth. Lievesley also raised concerns about Dr Foster's use of data, including examples with "grave" potential to mislead the public. Lievesley lost her case.

== Executive Director of Transparency and Open Data, UK government ==
In May 2011, Kelsey was asked by the British government to direct national policy on Transparency which is core to Prime Minister David Cameron's vision for public service reform. In January 2012, he left McKinsey to take up a full-time post as Britain's first Executive Director of Transparency and Open Data, based in the Cabinet Office. In February 2012, he was named by the British thinktank Reform a Reformer of the Year.

Kelsey argues that Transparency has the potential to enhance accountability, choice, productivity, and quality of service delivery; transform citizen participation in government; and drive economic growth." In a series of key policy announcements in 2011 - the Prime Minister's letter on Transparency to the Cabinet in July, the Open Data Consultation, and the Chancellor's Autumn Statement, the UK committed to release of new data across government including health, education, transport and criminal justice. Kelsey led the development of 'Unleashing the Potential' - the White Paper on Open Data - which was published in June 2012. This articulated the UK government's intention to move to a 'presumption of publication' for public data in machine-readable formats for free re-use. The Observer said it marked a 'new era in Open Data', while the UK Information commissioner said it marked a 'step change in transparency'. Announcements included publication of new datasets across Whitehall, the adoption of a core set of public data principles and the re-launch of data.gov.uk as a more comprehensive tool for data extraction. In April 2012, the UK became co-chair with Brazil of the Open Government Partnership, a global initiative involving more than 50 nations and international civil society to promote transparency and citizen participation.

== Return to National Health Service ==
On 24 May 2012, it was announced that Kelsey would return to the NHS, taking up the role of National Director for Patients and Information at NHS England Kelsey said in an interview that his focus in this role - which combines leadership of the technology, information and public engagement functions of the NHS - is to put transparency and public participation at the centre of a transformation of customer service in health and social care.

He was said by the Health Service Journal to be the seventeenth most powerful person in the English NHS in December 2013. In 2014, The Sunday Times listed Kelsey one of the 500 most influential people in Britain As of 2015, Kelsey was paid a salary of between £180,000 and £184,999 by NHS England, making him one of the 328 most highly paid people in the British public sector at that time.

== National Information Board ==
In April 2014, Kelsey was appointed National Information Director in health and care and chair of the National Information Board by the Department of Health in addition to his role at NHS England. The National Information Board brings together all national health and care bodies, together with local government, clinical leaders and civil society members to set data and technology priorities in health and care and advise the Department and Secretary of State accordingly. It also advises the secretary of state on the quality of data transparency in the NHS. In October 2014 the Five Year Forward View stated that 'harnessing the information revolution' was a key priority for improved quality and cost effectiveness in the NHS. It identified the NIB as the body responsible for leading transformation in digital services for patients, citizens and professionals - including full real time interoperability of patient records by 2020. In November 2014, the NIB published Personalised Health and Care 2020: A Framework for Action which detailed these information priorities. The proposals - which were published as formal government policy after Cabinet clearance - include providing patients with comprehensive access to all their medical records by 2018 and the ability to 'write into' them, establishing an NHS endorsement scheme for third party digital services and apps, giving citizens access to new online digital health services, and mandating safe digital record keeping - including patient and drug barcoding - in all NHS providers. The Times reported: 'Patients will be able to view test results and book appointments online under "radical" plans to make accessing the NHS as simple as online banking.'

== Australian Digital Health Agency ==
In August 2016, Kelsey became the first CEO of the Australian Digital Health Agency which was set up under a Federal government Rule. in conjunction with an inter-governmental agreement between the governments of Australia. It was charged with developing a new National Digital Health Strategy for the country and improving access to national digital health services. Australian Minister for Health Sussan Ley announced the appointment in August 2016.
