= Brian Jarman =

English physician and academic

Sir Brian Jarman

Personal details
- Born: 9 July 1933 (age 93) Romford, Essex, England
- Education: St Catharine's College, Cambridge and Imperial College London

Sir Brian Jarman OBE FRCGP FRCP FMedSci (born 9 July 1933) is a retired English physician and academic. He was professor of primary health care from 1983 to 1998 at Imperial College School of Medicine and president of the British Medical Association from 2003 to 2004.

The Hospital Standardised Mortality Ratio (HSMR) methodology was developed by Jarman, director of the Dr Foster Unit at Imperial College, London. This method was applied by Dr Foster Intelligence.

== Education ==
Jarman was educated at Barking Abbey School. Jarman originally trained in the natural sciences, graduating from St Catharine's College, Cambridge in 1954, and completing a PhD in geophysics at Imperial College in 1960. After working for Shell for three years, Jarman switched to medicine, completing a medical degree at Imperial College in 1969. He was a clinical fellow at Harvard in 1970 and later occasional lecturer.

== Honours ==
- Jarman received the OBE in 1988, and was knighted in 1998 Birthday Honours.
- He gave the Harveian Oration at the Royal College of Physicians in 1999, on "The Quality of Care in Hospitals".
- Fellow of the Royal College of General Practitioners (FRCGP) 1984, Fellow of the Royal College of Physicians (FRCP) 1988, Fellow of the Faculty of Public Health 1999 (FFPH)., Fellow of Imperial College 1999, Fellow of the Academy of Medical Sciences (FMedSci) 2000
