= County Hospital Louth =

- United Lincolnshire Hospitals NHS Trust
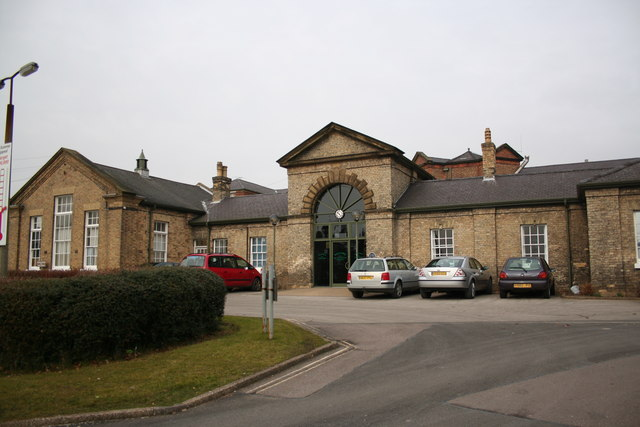
- County Hospital Louth

- Shown in Lincolnshire

Geography
- Location: High Holme Road, Louth, Lincolnshire, England
- Coordinates: 53.3713°N 0.0094°W

Organisation
- Care system: NHS England
- Type: Community

Services
- Emergency department: No

History
- Founded: 1837

Links
- Website: www.ulh.nhs.uk

County Hospital Louth is a healthcare facility in High Holme Road, Louth, Lincolnshire, England. It is managed by United Lincolnshire Hospitals NHS Trust.

== History ==
The facility, which was designed by Sir George Gilbert Scott and William Bonython Moffatt, opened as Louth Union Workhouse in 1837. An infirmary was built at the rear of the site. It became the Louth County Infirmary in 1930 and, after joining the National Health Service in 1948, it became County Hospital Louth in 1955. A major programme of fire protection works was carried out at the hospital in autumn 2017.
