= Bromhead Institution for Nurses and the Bromhead Nursing Home =

Coordinates: 53.2377°N 0.5335°W

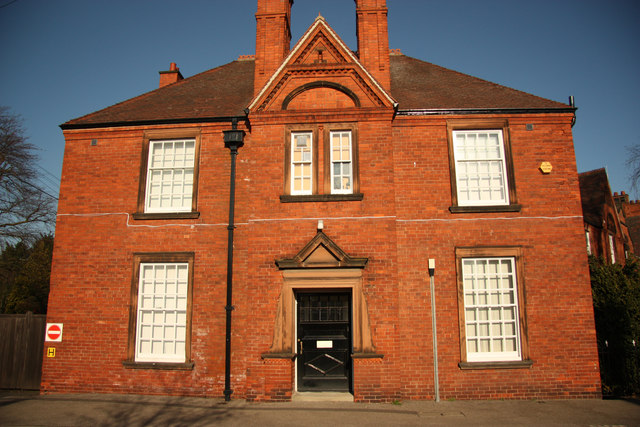
Bromhead Hospital, Lincoln. "The Red House" was built in 1887 and named after A. F. Bromhead, the founder. It was taken over by the NHS in 1948, but in 1981 became an independent hospital. Since 2001 it has been a private hospital and is called the Lincoln Hospital.

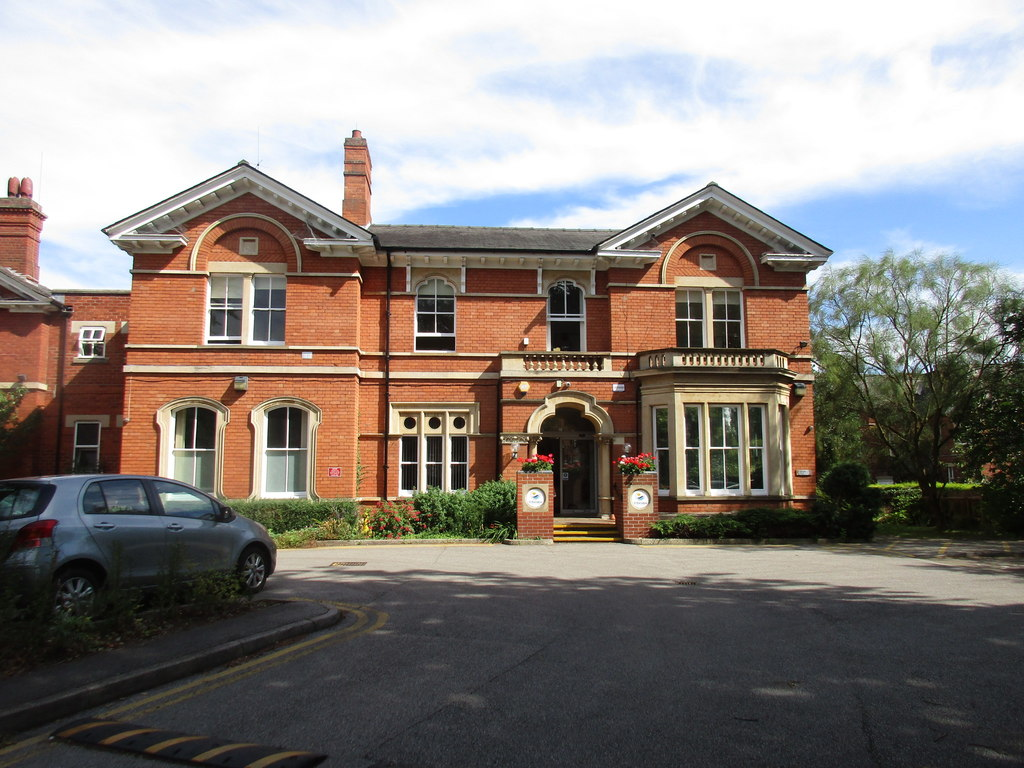
Essendon House which became the Bromhead Nurses' Home and institute offices in 1907, and is now St Barnabas Hospice, Lincoln.

The Bromhead Institution for Nurses and the Bromhead Nursing Home (1867–1950) was a healthcare facility in Lincoln.

== History ==
In 1864 the Ladies' Nursing Fund Committee was created to supply higher quality nurses to Lincoln County Hospital. This arrangement ended three years later after a difference of opinion between the hospital authorities. In 1866 the Bromhead Institution for Nurses opened to supply trained nurses for the sick poor in Lincoln, and to other hospitals, and during epidemics, such as the Lincoln typhoid epidemic. The institute was based in the home of Anne Fector Bromhead in Greestone Road, Lincoln. Although she was not formally trained as a nurse Bromhead was the first lady superintendent, and after her death, her daughter Henrietta became the second untrained lady superintendent. The institute expanded and in 1887 the Red House was built on the junction of Nettleham Road and Church Lane as a memorial to Bromhead. This became the Bromhead Nursing Home and cared for wealthy private patients. The nearby Essendon House was acquired in 1907 to provide for accommodation for the nursing staff, and offices for the Institution for Nurses. Bromhead Nurses were easily recognised by their distinctive uniform of red flannel waistcoats which they wore over their bodices in winter and white pique waistcoats in summer. They wore nurses caps with net ruches and two streamers down the back. This was the same nurses hat and tails as worn by sisters at the London Hospital where the Bromhead's third and fourth lady superintendents (also known as a matron) had trained under Eva Luckes.

In 1937, the Bromhead Maternity Home was opened. In 1948 the NHS took over the Bromhead Nursing Home. In 1981 this was taken over by a charitable trust and renamed as the Bromhead Hospital. Since 2001 it has been a private hospital, and is currently part of the Circle Health Group and known as The Lincoln Hospital. Essendon House, the former nurses home and offices is now St Barnabas Hospice.

== Notable staff ==
- Anne Fector Bromhead (1812–1886) was the founding member and first lady superintendent; she was not formally trained.
- Henrietta Bromhead (died 1906) was the second lady superintendent. She was involved in a libel lawsuit with another nurse in 1906 which was resolved before the conclusion of the trial.
- Bessie Stephenson (1872–1960) was the first trained lady superintendent between 1907 and 1910. Stephenson trained between 1898 and 1890 at The London. During the First World War she was a Matron in the Queen Alexandra's Imperial Nursing Service.
- Susan Mary Somerset (1876–1962) was the second trained lady superintendent, from 1910 until at least 1939. Somerset trained at The London between 1906 and 1908. She won second prize in her probationers examinations, and became a Holiday Sister and Matron's Office Assistant after her training. In 1922 the Somerset Wing of the Bromhead Home was named after her.
