= Cambio Healthcare Systems =

Swedish healthcare company

- Industry: Healthcare software
- Headquarters: Linköping, Sweden
- Area served: Europe
- Products: Clinical decision support systems, patient flow management software, healthcare IT systems
- Website: www.cambio.se

Cambio Healthcare Systems is a healthcare company based in Linköping. It has offices in Reading, Berkshire, Aarhus, Stockholm, Umeå, and Motala. It provides computerised clinical decision support services.

It acquired Cayder, a British health technology company in 2017. It operates in Colombo, where its Research & Development center is located, as Cambio Software Engineering. 250 software engineers are employed there.

Cambio has a partnership agreement with Savience, based in Blisworth for the use of its clinical management systems. This lets patients check-in for hospital appointments remotely.

It entered into a five-year contract with Coventry and Warwickshire Partnership NHS Trust to implement its patient flow management system in July 2018. Electronic touchscreens will be provided on every ward, so staff have an "at-a-glance view" of bed management and patient flow.

Cambio made a three-year agreement with Worcestershire Health and Care NHS Trust in 2018 to create what was described as "a disruptive clinical solution for community and mental health trusts". This involves an integrated platform for e-prescribing and medicines administration and clinical decision support systems designed for mental healthcare. It is funded by the Global Digital Exemplar programme. It will use FHIR standards, which would let other NHS trusts link any third-party applications for secure access to their patient records.

The company signed a deal with the Lincolnshire Sustainability and transformation plan for real-time dashboards, using the company's Patient Flow Manager product to help forecast capacity and demand in November 2018.

In 2019, the company acquired Daintel ApS.

In 2022, the company acquired FRISQ Holding AB.

In 2025, the company acquired LeapScribe AB.
