= United Lincolnshire Teaching Hospitals NHS Trust =

NHS hospital trust

- Type: NHS trust
- Established: 28 February 2000
- Headquarters: Greetwell Road; Lincoln; LN2 5QY
- Hospitals: County Hospital Louth; Grantham and District Hospital; Lincoln County Hospital; Pilgrim Hospital
- Staff: 6,544 (2018/19)
- Website: www.ulh.nhs.uk

United Lincolnshire Teaching Hospitals NHS Trust is an NHS trust which runs County Hospital Louth, Lincoln County Hospital, Pilgrim Hospital in Boston, Skegness and District Hospital, and Grantham and District Hospital.

The trust established the Path Links Pathology Service jointly with Northern Lincolnshire and Goole Hospitals NHS Foundation Trust in 2001.

== History ==
The trust was established on 28 February 2000, and became operational on 1 April 2000. In 2024 it joined a group with Lincolnshire Community Health Services NHS Trust and in 2026 it was announced that the two organisations would merge and create a single NHS Trust.

== Performance ==
In July 2012 the Trust chairman, David Bowles was forced to resign after being threatened with suspension for refusing to commit the Trust to meeting national waiting targets. The Trust was exceeding targets for emergency treatment.

In October 2013 as a result of the Keogh Review the Trust was put into the highest risk category by the Care Quality Commission and put in special measures.

In December 2013 the Trust was one of thirteen hospital trusts named by Dr Foster Intelligence as having higher than expected higher mortality indicator scores for the period April 2012 to March 2013 in their Hospital Guide 2013. It was put into a buddying arrangement with Sheffield Teaching Hospitals NHS Foundation Trust.

The Trust predicted a deficit of £16.7m in 2013–14. In February 2016 it was expecting a deficit of £57.8 million for the year 2015/6.

The trust was one of 26 responsible for half of the national growth in patients waiting more than four hours in accident and emergency over the 2014/5 winter.

In December 2018 it had the highest number of ambulances delayed by more than 30 minutes of any trust in England. In 2017-18 only 75.1% of A&E patients were seen within four hours.

Between January and March 2018 864 operations at the trust were cancelled at the last minute for non-clinical reasons - the highest number of any NHS trust. In October 2018 it predicted that it would spend £32 million on agency staff in the financial year 2018/9 because of difficulty in recruiting and retaining staff, particularly middle grade doctors. It actually spent £37 million.

In 2020 the emergency department at Grantham and District Hospital was temporarily closed. In April 2021 a judicial review at the High Court ruled that the trust did not consult properly on their plans for a 'green site' there, because they thought there would be too much resistance to it. Local campaigners were incensed.

A survey of almost 50,000 patients by the Care Quality Commission in 2021 found the emergency department rated least favourably of all those in England.

== Development ==
The trust was one of the beneficiaries of Boris Johnson's announcement of capital funding for the NHS in August 2019, with an allocation of £21.3 million for new urgent and emergency care zones in Boston accident and emergency.
