= Pilgrim Hospital =

- United Lincolnshire Hospitals NHS Trust
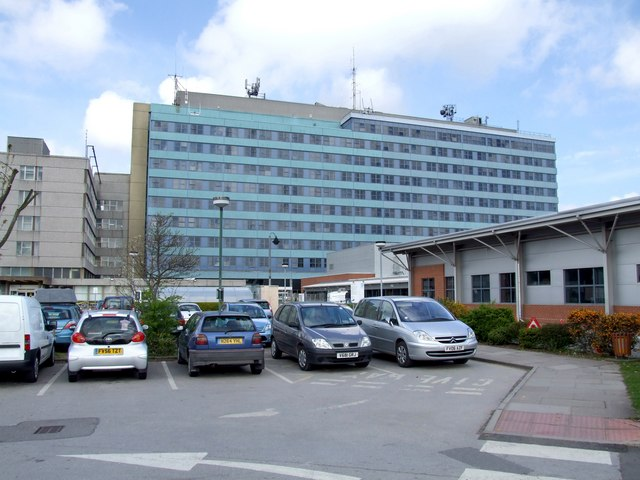
- East side of the hospital from near the entrance

- Shown in Lincolnshire

Geography
- Location: Sibsey Road, Boston, PE21 9QS, Lincolnshire, England
- Coordinates: 52.99105°N 0.00978°W

Organisation
- Care system: NHS
- Type: District General

Services
- Emergency department: Yes
- Beds: 391

History
- Founded: 28 February 1971

Links
- Website: www.ulh.nhs.uk
- Lists: Hospitals in England

Pilgrim Hospital is a hospital in the east of Lincolnshire on the A16, north of the town of Boston near the mini-roundabout with the A52. It is situated virtually on the Greenwich Meridian and adjacent to Boston High School. The fenland area of Lincolnshire is covered by this hospital, being the county's second largest hospital after Lincoln County Hospital. It is managed by United Lincolnshire Hospitals NHS Trust.

== History ==
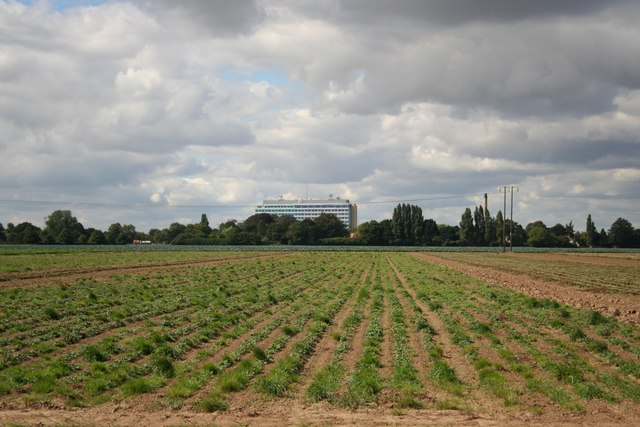
View further from the east

=== Early history ===
The hospital has its origins in temporary premises which opened as the Boston Cottage Hospital in 1872. A purpose-built facility designed by William Henry Wheeler was built in Bath Gardens between 1874 and 1875. Additions included an outpatients' department completed in 1926, a nurses' home in 1934 and a maternity wing in 1936. The facility joined the National Health Service in 1948.

The first hospital in Boston, Boston Cottage Hospital, opened in September 1872, in two small cottages on Stanbow Lane; it cost £200 a year, and treated around 50 people in the first year.

=== Design ===
Following a design competition held in 1961, a completely new building was designed by the Building Design Partnership, one of its earliest public buildings, under Sir George Grenfell-Baines.

The design was agreed in January 1963. Phase 1 involved 115 in-patient beds, the outpatients, a single-storey A&E and X-ray, and Physical Medicine. The five-storey 72-bed maternity department would be built in this phase, but would be initially part of outpatients, until the whole hospital had been later completed. The former maternity unit was at Boston General and Wyberton West (owned by the county council) hospitals.

There would be residential accommodation for around 150 nursing staff, to the north of the site, costing around £150,000.

The hospital name was chosen at a meeting in September 1967 at Holbeach Hospital; this name was chosen, as a snappy title would save significant time over the telephone, and avoid confusion. Many other possible names were rejected.

Around 23 student nurses joined the Boston School of Nursing, each year.

=== Construction (Phase 1 ) ===
Work on phase 1, undertaken by Shepherd Building Group and due to cost £2.25m, began in August 1967.

The first phase replaced Boston General Hospital, on South End, and Boston London Road Hospital. The casualty department at the general hospital was moved to the London Road Hospital in November 1967.

The inauguration of construction work was performed on 11 June 1968, by the Earl of Ancaster, with four hundred guests. The construction work employed around 1,000 people. In 1968 it was estimated that the first phase would cost £3m, and the second phase would cost £3.3m. The hospital would cost £1.25m to run.

The ceremony was attended by the architect, George Grenfell-Baines, and the Bishop of Grantham, Ross Hook, who gave a prayer. When the new hospital opened, the hospitals in Spalding and Holbeach were planned close, and the local councils made protests; however, because of the protests, the hospitals were not closed.

The boiler house, the first section to be built, had three boilers, with a 165-ft chimney.

Some 400 friction piles, driven 30 feet deep, were used for the construction of the main ten-storey block. The residential block was mostly complete by the end of 1968.

The first part of the hospital opened on 9 March 1970 - when the outpatients, and X-ray department, moved from Boston General Hospital. The hospital labs opened on 2 March 1970, one week earlier.

The bus service to the hospital, in March 1970, was not adequate.

The A&E was planned to move in autumn 1970.

The maternity unit opened on 19 November 1970, with the first birth being a C-section of a woman from Spalding.

The first main phase of the new hospital, named after the town's Pilgrim Fathers, was meant to open on 3 January 1971, with the transfer of the X-ray department, but this phase only opened on 28 February 1971. The other Boston hospitals were not planned to close until late 1974. Three hundred babies had been born at the new hospital by March 1971, with 400 staff at the hospital.

=== Construction (Phase 2) ===
At the end of June 1971, the £3m contract for the second phase was awarded to F. G. Minter, of London; Minter had built the BBC Broadcasting House in 1932. The other departments were planned to open in early 1975. The design of phase 2 included a three-storey building with the School of Nursing on the second floor, and four operating theatres on the third floor.

In May and June 1971, the A&E was short of medical staff overnight, so local GPs volunteered to staff the A&E at night.

Construction of phase 2 began on 12 July 1971.

It was originally hoped to have the full hospital opened during 1975, which was delayed to April or May in 1976, but by August 1976, the ten-storey main block hospital of the hospital was not scheduled to open until 5 September 1976.

Running costs would be £5.5m per year. There were to be fifteen private patient beds, but only nine were eventually included in 1976. The entrance had a general shop, and bank branch. The kitchens would serve 1,500 meals per day. The main operating theatre suite, in the three-storey building, opened on 24 October 1976. There were 531 nursing staff. Staff from the London Road hospital moved by 21 November 1976. It took up to twelve months for all facilities to move to the new hospital from former hospitals. Furniture cost £731,000.

The new facility was officially opened by Princess Anne on 23 June 1977, arriving by helicopter at 2.15pm at Boston High School. The chief constable of Lincolnshire Police also attended. There was a short service by the Bishop of Grantham.

=== Construction (Phase 3) ===
On 25 April 1989, Birgitte, Duchess of Gloucester opened the Phase 3 development, travelling to Boston with the Queen's Flight. There was a £4.3m psychiatry department. Sir Michael Carlisle attended, and the Bishop of Grantham said a prayer.

=== Recent history ===
The £2.1 million medical education centre was built in late 1992 by Lindum Construction (for the Trent Regional Health Authority). It was later renovated by Taylor Pearson of Woodhall Spa in April 2008.

The Prince of Wales visited the hospital on 17 March 1992, having earlier opened the Waterside Centre in Lincoln, flying in by helicopter.

The Princess Royal opened the MRI scanner on 8 March 2000.

In 2010, the Energy Centre was overhauled. Cofely (part of GDF Suez) installed a 526 kWe engine-based CHP, supplied by GE Jenbacher. It was supplemented by a 2.9 MW woodchip-fuelled biomass steam boiler, supplied by Binder of Austria, with further conventional dual fuel steam boilers. The wood chips are locally sourced from Thetford Forest.

In June 2011 a £2.5 million renovation began on the Endoscopy unit.

== Notable staff ==
A series of four matrons who had trained at The London Hospital under Eva Luckes ran the original cottage hospital in Boston for over fifteen years.

- Kathleen Disney, 1894–1897.
- Louisa Pauline Lessey, 1897–1899. Prior to her before her promotion Lessey was charge nurse between 1894 and 1897.
- Mary H. Poulton, 1899–1901.
- Evelyn Newman, 1901 until at least 1911.

== Facilities ==
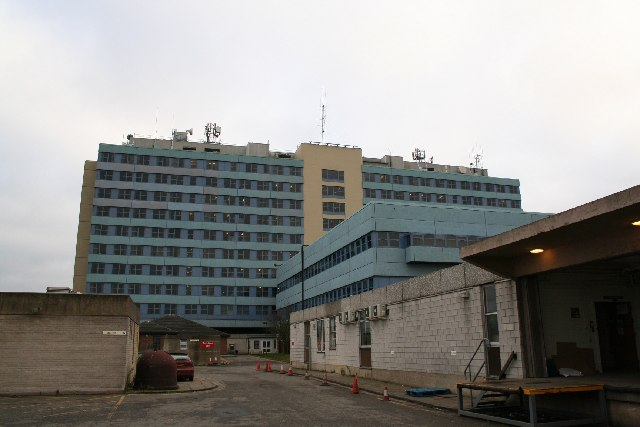
View from the rear

The main part of the hospital consists of a ten-storey building. It has twenty wards and has a busy maternity unit. Just north of the building there is a helicopter landing pad, used by the Lincolnshire & Nottinghamshire Air Ambulance.

An innovative way of managing hip fractures developed since May 2012, has seen the hospital recognised as the best in the country for treating patients with broken hips with 30 day mortality of 6% compared with a national average of 9% and an average length of stay of 11.6 days compared with a national figure of 23 days.

The Care Quality Commission raised concerns about the treatment of children in the emergency department, and about the early detection of critically ill patients.

== See also ==
- List of hospitals in England
- Peterborough City Hospital
