= Modesty in medical settings =

Concept in medical treatment

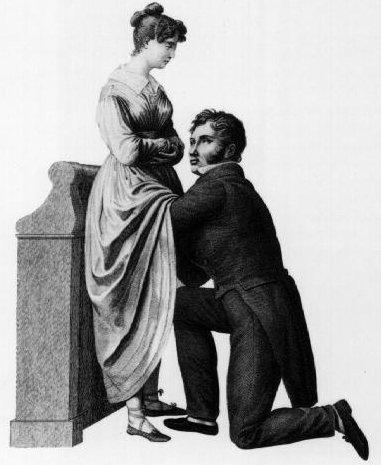
Various methods have been used to protect patient's privacy. This drawing by Jacques-Pierre Maygnier (1822) shows a "compromise" procedure, in which the physician is kneeling before the woman but cannot see her genitalia.

Modesty in medical settings refers to the practices and equipment used to preserve patient modesty in medical examination and clinics.

== History ==
Prior to the invention of the stethoscope, a physician who wanted to perform auscultation to listen to heart sounds or noise inside a body would have to physically place their ear against the body of the person being examined. In 1816, male physician René Laennec invented the stethoscope as a way to respect the modesty of a female patient, as it would have been awkward for him to put his ear on her chest.

== Methods ==
Hospital gowns increase modesty as compared to the patient presenting nude, but in the past, there have been odd clothing which exposes the body. Some contemporary changes to the design of hospital gowns have been proposed.

== Society and culture ==
In places with more cultural diversity, people from minority groups often make specific requests for modesty in healthcare; some minority women consequently do not access healthcare. Muslims in non-Muslim societies also occasionally make requests for modesty.
