= NAViGO Health and Social Care CIC =

NAViGO Health and Social Care CIC is a not for profit social enterprise originating from the North East Lincolnshire mental health services formerly provided by North East Lincolnshire Care Trust Plus.

The organisation was created in April 2011 as part of the Transforming Community Services programme. Kevin Bond, the Chief Executive Officer, explained at length to the Transition Institute the reasons for the spin out into a social enterprise, for which a large majority of staff and service users voted. The company was featured by the Health Service Journal in its list of Best Places to Work 2014.

It operated Tukes a service to provide training and employment opportunities to people who have little or no previous training, qualifications or work experience due to their mental health problems. Both were based in Grimsby and were forced to move to new premises in 2014 because of rising rent.

In April 2022 it merged its subsidiary, Navigo Extra with Ace Homecare and Care4All, also social care providers, to form a new registered charity to serve North East Lincolnshire called Nurtrio.
