= Lincolnshire & Nottinghamshire Air Ambulance =

English charity air ambulance

Lincs & Notts Air Ambulance
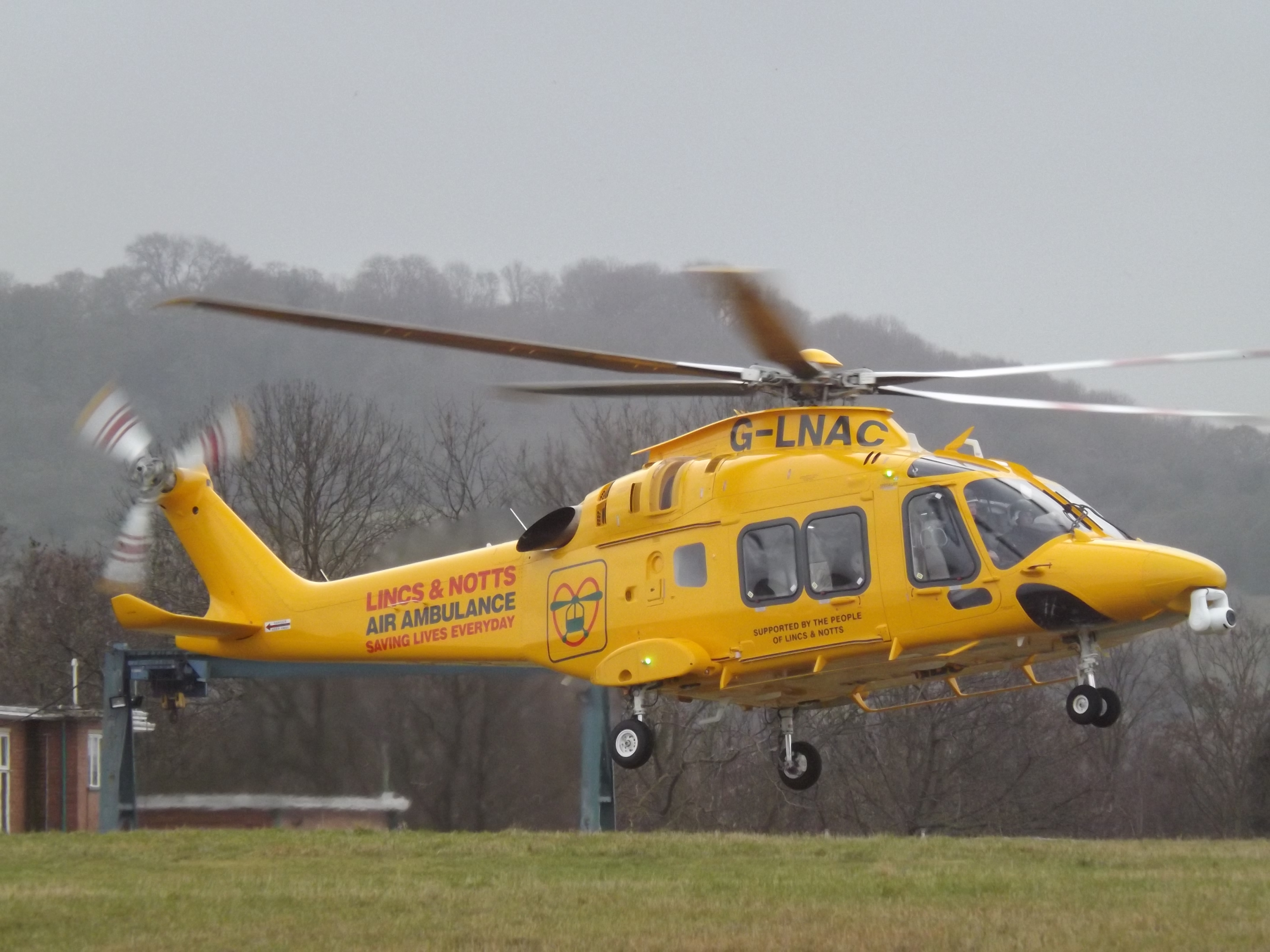
- The AgustaWestland AW169 introduced in 2017
- Abbreviation: LNAA
- Formation: April 1994
- Legal status: Registered charity (1017501); Non-profit company (02788157)
- Purpose: Doctor and paramedic crew attend the most serious of incidents and carry out life-saving advanced procedures on scene before transferring patients to the hospital via helicopter.
- Location: Lincoln, England
- Region served: Lincolnshire and Nottinghamshire
- Chief Executive: Karen Jobling
- Main organ: The Lincolnshire and Nottinghamshire Air Ambulance Charitable Trust
- Revenue: £13.6 million (2024)
- Employees: 59 (2024)
- Volunteers: 155 (2024)
- Website: www.ambucopter.org.uk

The Lincs & Notts Air Ambulance (LNAA) is an air ambulance service operated by the Lincolnshire and Nottinghamshire Air Ambulance Charity. It is tasked by the East Midlands Ambulance Service (EMAS) to provide a pre-hospital critical care helicopter emergency medical service (HEMS).

LNAA is a registered charity and, since 2022, has not received any government or NHS funding for its missions.

Based in Lincolnshire near RAF Waddington, the service covers the administrative counties of Lincolnshire and Nottinghamshire, including the unitary authorities of Nottingham, North East Lincolnshire, and North Lincolnshire in England.

As an operational base within Nottinghamshire at Nottingham (Tollerton) Airport was slated to end after 2025, a new helipad complex is projected nearby at Edwalton.

== History ==
A group of consultants at Pilgrim Hospital proposed the establishment of a helicopter service to transport seriously ill patients to specialist units at other hospitals, thereby avoiding the lengthy transfer times associated with Lincolnshire's road network. A charitable trust was established on 9 February 1993.

The Lincolnshire Air Ambulance became operational at RAF Waddington in April 1994. Due to the proximity of Waddington to Nottinghamshire, the service was extended to include Nottinghamshire in 1997.

In the financial year ending March 2024, the charity reported an income of £13.6 million. Expenditure totalled £11.1M, of which £8.1M was allocated to operating the charitable service.

== Operational service ==
The charity's management works in collaboration with East Midlands Ambulance Service (EMAS), which requests assistance when a patient requires urgent medical treatment and rapid transfer to a hospital emergency department. More seriously injured patients are typically transported to the Queen's Medical Centre in Nottingham or Hull Royal Infirmary, rather than to hospitals in Boston, Grantham, Lincoln or Scunthorpe.

In December 2013, the service completed its first full night mission, attending the scene and transferring the patient to hospital during the hours of darkness.

The helicopter is fully equipped for night operations, including a searchlight. It typically operates between 07:00 and 02:00, with the clinical team responding by critical care car from 02:00 to 07:00.

In April 2021, a new operational airbase was opened off the A15 Sleaford Road, near RAF Waddington. The purpose-built facility includes a helipad and accommodates the charity's critical care cars.

An operational base at Nottingham (Tollerton) Airport was slated to end after 2025. A new helipad project is planned nearby at Edwalton on land donated to the charity.

== Critical care cars ==
In September 2020, the charity introduced a specialist critical care car (CCC) in Nottingham. The CCC is staffed by HEMS doctors and paramedics and carries the same medical equipment as the charity's helicopter, including a ventilator and advanced medications. It provides rapid response to emergencies in Nottingham and the surrounding areas.

In 2021, the charity acquired two BMW X5 vehicles for use as rapid response critical care cars. These are equipped with the same specialist medical equipment as the helicopter and are deployed in situations where the helicopter cannot land or is unavailable. One vehicle is dedicated to covering the Nottingham area, while the other provides additional support during periods of high demand, such as the summer tourist season.

During the summer of 2021, the charity operated a dedicated critical care response service along the Lincolnshire coast. From 1 June 2021, this included a CCC equipped to the same standard as an air ambulance, used while awaiting delivery of a second helicopter. On 22 June 2021, a second helicopter was introduced to replace the CCC and provide a dedicated HEMS service to Lincolnshire's east coast during the peak tourist season. This second helicopter and the associated east coast service were withdrawn on 31 August 2021 following the conclusion of the tourist season.

In 2026, two new Volvo XC90 cars were announced, based at Tollerton.

== Organisational structure ==
The charity's headquarters and helicopter are located in a purpose-built facility on the A15 near Lincoln, situated opposite the former base at RAF Waddington.

== Fleet ==
The original helicopter operated by the service was an MBB Bo 105, registered G-PASC, which was in service between 1994 and 2000.

From 2000 to 2010, the service used a helicopter registered G-LNAA. After its retirement, it was returned to Specialist Aviation Services at Gloucestershire Airport, where it was overhauled and subsequently used as a fleet spare for medical operations.

In November 2010, the charity took delivery of a new MD902 Explorer. The aircraft was capable of flying longer distances at higher speeds and was fully equipped for night operations. The leased helicopter was the first to feature infection-resistant interior surfaces. It retained the yellow livery of its predecessor and was registered as G-LNCT, reflecting the name of the Charitable Trust.

In October 2015, the charity announced the acquisition of an AgustaWestland AW169 to replace the MD902. The new aircraft, registered G-LNAC, offered a larger cabin, improved patient access, and increased speed. It was formally accepted into service in July 2016.

In June 2021, the charity introduced a second helicopter—an AgustaWestland AW109, registered G-RSCU and designated Helimed 82—to provide dedicated cover for the Lincolnshire coast. This enabled the primary helicopter to respond to other emergencies during the busy summer months. The AW109 was based at the charity's headquarters near Lincoln and deployed daily to Strubby Airfield in Louth, Lincolnshire, to reduce response times to incidents on the east coast. The second helicopter was withdrawn from service on 31 August 2021 and returned to its owner, Sloane Helicopters, a private HEMS provider, from whom it had been loaned.

On 25 September 2021, the charity took delivery of a new AW169 helicopter, registered G-LNCC, intended to replace the existing aircraft. The new helicopter entered service on 7 October 2021, flying its first mission shortly after completing its final test flight.

== Licence ==
In late January 2025, the service was temporarily stood down by East Midlands Ambulance Service (EMAS) for a short, agreed period due to a drug re-licensing issue. Although there was broad consensus among pre-hospital specialist consultants that there were no patient safety concerns, EMAS stated that the absence of certain medications could compromise patient safety.

The trust maintained that the majority of patients did not require access to advanced medications. Following contact with the Home Office, flight operations were re-authorised on 6 February 2025. Full operational capability was restored on 11 February, and the trust initiated an internal investigation into the administrative error responsible.

== See also ==
- East Midlands Ambulance Service
- The Air Ambulance Service
- Air ambulances in the United Kingdom
