= Dr Foster Intelligence =

UK healthcare information organisation

Dr Foster Intelligence is a provider of healthcare information in the United Kingdom, monitoring the performance of the National Health Service and providing information to the public. It was launched in February 2006 and is owned by Telstra. Dr Foster aims to improve the quality and efficiency of health and social care. It monitors the performance of the National Health Service and provides information to the public. In 2010, the Dr Foster 2010 Hospital Guide was launched in The Observer newspaper and on the BBC.

== History ==
=== Formation ===
In 2006, the UK Department of Health (DoH) paid £12m for a stake in Dr Foster Intelligence, a new joint venture with Dr Foster LLP. The following year, a House of Commons committee raised serious concerns about the legality of the acquisition, describing it as a "hole and corner deal".

The main people at the time were Tim Kelsey (Chair) and Jake Arnold-Forster (CEO). A 'gag deal' was negotiated in connection with whistle-blower Denise Lievesley's departure from the NHS Information Centre.

According to The Guardian, Lievesley "protested ... when a contract ... was awarded to Dr Foster without (in her view) proper procurement procedures. She was eased out of her job, with a gagging clause preventing her from telling her side of the story."

=== Criticism of Dr Foster acquisition ===
In February 2007, the UK's National Audit Office published a report raising serious concerns about the joint venture. The National Audit Office was prompted to investigate following concerns raised about the legality of the joint venture, including a letter from an anonymous whistleblower. The report concluded that the DoH failed to go through proper procedures and could not show value for money from the acquisition.

The House of Commons Public Accounts Committee also released a highly critical report on the deal in June 2007. The Committee noted concerns that Dr Foster’s operation had been valued at between £10m and £15m, yet the DoH paid £12m for a 50% share of the joint venture company, Dr Foster Intelligence.

Committee chair Edward Leigh criticized the Department of Health for its lack of transparency, stating that by pursuing its deal with Dr Foster LLP, the department failed in its duty to be open to Parliament and the taxpayer. He added that Treasury guidance on joint ventures between public and private sectors was ignored – instead the deal was "handed to Dr Foster on a plate".

=== Sale to Telstra ===
In March 2015, Dr Foster Intelligence was sold to Australian communications company Telstra Corporation for between £10m and £20m.

In December 2025, Telstra Health UK announced the sale of Dr Foster, its UK-based healthcare analytics and benchmarking business, to Dorson Transform Ltd, led by former UK Health Secretary Stephen Dorrell. The transaction was described as creating new opportunities for data-driven improvements in National Health Service (NHS) care and building on Dr Foster’s legacy in mortality surveillance and clinical performance benchmarking.

== Dr Foster Hospital Guide ==
In January 2001, Dr Foster published its first Hospital Guide in the Sunday Times; it included mortality data using the Hospital Standardised Mortality Ratio (HSMR) for every hospital. This was the first time that such a comparative measure of quality had been published for a national health economy anywhere in the world and it revealed widespread variation in adjusted death rates between English hospitals.

The methodology was developed by Brian Jarman, director of the Dr Foster Unit at Imperial College, London. It prompted widespread media interest and stimulated a national debate over quality in healthcare.

The Dr Foster Hospital Guide is now published on an annual basis, and remains an important independent publication on quality in NHS hospitals. Its latest edition was published in November 2012 and it identified a number of underperforming hospitals in England and a higher risk of avoidable mortality at the weekends.

== Dr Foster Unit at Imperial College London ==
The Dr Foster Unit at Imperial College London was established in 2000 within the Division of Epidemiology, Public Health and Primary Care, part of the Faculty of Medicine at Imperial College London. The unit is funded through a grant from Dr Foster Intelligence and also receives funding from the Centre for Patient Safety and Service Quality (CPSSQ) and Centre for Infection Prevention and Management.

The Unit is now in its tenth year and is headed by Professor Sir Brian Jarman, Emeritus Professor of Primary Care, with Professor Paul Aylin, Professor in Epidemiology and consultant in Public Health, as Assistant Director.

== Code of conduct ==
Dr Foster works to a code of conduct that prohibits political bias. This is monitored by an independent ethics committee previously chaired by Professor Alan Maynard from The University of York. In the event of a complaint, the committee reviews the work and adjudicates as to whether this should be upheld. The Ethics Committee also acts as a forum for people to come together to learn about health policy developments. It hosted speakers including Andrew Lansley and Bruce Keogh, as well as running a series of debates and dinners that explore relevant health topics.
