= National Electronic Health Transition Authority =

Australian government program

The National Electronic Health Transition Authority (NEHTA) was established in July 2005 as a joint enterprise between the Australian Government and state and territory governments to identify, and develop the necessary foundations for electronic health (eHealth).

NEHTA aims to unlock eHealth system aspects and improve the ways in which information is electronically collected and exchanged.

In 2014, a government review recommended that NEHTA be scrapped. The 2015–16 Federal Budget provided funding to strengthen eHealth governance arrangements consistent with the review. This included the transition of relevant activities and resources from the National E-Health Transition Authority (NEHTA) and from the national My Health Record system operation activities managed by the Department of Health, to a new entity called the Australian Digital Health Agency.

== Purpose and vision ==
=== Purpose ===
To lead the uptake of eHealth systems of national significance and to coordinate the progression and accelerate the adoption of eHealth by delivering urgently needed integration infrastructure and standards for health information.

=== Vision ===
NEHTA is the leading organisation in supporting the national vision for eHealth in Australia, working openly, constructively and collaboratively with consumers, providers, funders, policy makers and the broader healthcare industry to enable safer, higher quality, accessible, equitable, efficient and sustainable healthcare. To enhance healthcare by enabling access to the right information, for the right person, at the right time and right place.

== 2011 – 2012 Strategic Plan ==
NEHTA continues to develop and progress the national infrastructure and adoption support required for eHealth in Australia, as mandated and funded by the Council of Australian Governments (COAG). The Commonwealth Government approved the development of the Personally Controlled Electronic Health Record (PCEHR) system in 2010, and allocated funding to deliver this by July 2012. NEHTA has been contracted as a managing agent on behalf of the Department of Health and Ageing (DOHA) in relation to contracts and agreements for: National Infrastructure Partner/s; National Change and Adoption Partner; Benefits Evaluation Partner; and eHealth Sites.

NEHTA’s five strategic priorities defining their role in adoption and implementation are:

1. Deliver, operationalise, and enhance the essential foundations required.
2. Coordinate the progression of priority eHealth initiatives.
3. Manage the delivery of key components of DOHA’s PCEHR Programme.
4. Accelerate national adoption of eHealth.
5. Lead the further progression of eHealth in Australia.

== Supporting the Australian Health System ==
NEHTA aims to develop Health Care in Australia by adopting eHealth systems.eHealth systems’ ability to securely and efficiently exchange data can drastically improve the ways in which clinical and administrative information is communicated between healthcare professionals. In delivering this, NETHA will support the Australian health system by:

- Improving the quality of healthcare services, by enabling authorized clinicians to access a patient’s integrated healthcare information and history, sourced directly from clinical notes, test results and prescriptions using standardized clinical data formats and terminologies.
- Streamlining multi-disciplinary care management, enabling seamless handovers of care by ensuring efficient electronic referrals; authorised access to up-to-date clinical opinions and patient healthcare histories via shared patient health records; and fast, secure mechanisms for directly exchanging important notifications between healthcare providers.
- Improving clinical and administrative efficiency, by standardising certain types of healthcare information to be recorded in eHealth systems; uniquely identifying patients, healthcare providers and medical products; and reforming the purchasing process for medical products.
- Maintaining high standards of patient privacy and information security.

== Infrastructure ==
NEHTA turned on the eHealth record system on 1 July 2012, originally called the Personally Controlled eHealth Record (PCEHR) and now called the My Health Record. This included developing eHealth solutions, such as Healthcare Identifiers (Healthcare Identifiers), the Australian Medicines Terminology, SNOMED CT, and Secure Messaging. Australia is the first country to have assembled such a large-scale, integrated piece of national infrastructure.

== Security ==
A critical aspect in electronically coordinating patient care across the healthcare sector is to ensure that healthcare information can be securely accessed and shared amongst healthcare providers, when and where it is required. To ensure the security of patient information NEHTA has created the National eHealth Security and Access Framework.

The National eHealth Security and Access Framework have been developed as a control mechanism to ‘increase certainty that health information is created and accessed in a secure and trustworthy manner’. It aims to ensure:

- Access to consumer health information.
- The provenance of all electronic health information is traceable from its creation.

NEHTA has developed a privacy management framework that aims to ensure that privacy considerations are integrated into the design, management and policies created with eHealth initiatives across NEHTA.

== In the media ==
=== 17 May 2013 ===
On 17 May 2013 The National E-Health Transition Authority (NEHTA) was successful in an eHealth trial of secure messaging. NEHTA claims that Australian healthcare professionals will soon be able to share clinical information through online messaging. The trial included five healthcare messaging vendors: Argus Connect, Global Health, Healthlink, LRS Health and Medical Objects. The vendors successfully sent and received secure messages from each other, showing the interoperability of the messaging system.

The progress that has been achieved by this Project will mean any medical practitioner – be they a public or private GP, specialist or surgeon – will be able to share information over time through online secure messaging ... We can see that this technology is available, it does work and all healthcare providers will have the ability over time to connect across a wide range of clinical information systems. It will increase electronic clinical information exchange between healthcare professionals, decrease the use of paper based communication and importantly provide more timely and accurate patient health information. - Dr Mukesh Haikerwal, Head of Clinical Leadership and Stakeholder Management.
