= Australian Digital Health Agency =

Australian Government agency

Agency overview
- Formed: 30 January 2016 (established); 1 July 2016 (operational)
- Preceding agency: National E-Health Transition Authority
- Jurisdiction: Australian Government
- Motto: Connecting you to better healthcare
- Employees: 242 (30 June 2019)
- Annual budget: A$287 million (2018–19)
- Minister responsible: Mark Butler, Minister for Health and Aged Care
- Agency executives: Amanda Cattermole, Chief Executive Officer; Peter O'Halloran, Chief Digital Officer; Paul Creech, Chief Program Officer; Prof Malcom Thatcher, Chief Technology Officer; Lisa Rauter, Chief Operating Officer; Dr Steve Hambleton, Chief Clinical Advisor; Dr Elizabeth Deveny, Board Chair
- Parent department: Department of Health and Aged Care
- Website: digitalhealth.gov.au

The Australian Digital Health Agency is the Australian Government statutory agency responsible for My Health Record, Australia's digital prescriptions and health referral system, and other e-health programs under the national digital health strategy. The agency replaces the former National E-Health Transition Authority which ceased on 1 July 2016. The agency is led by its chief executive officer, board, and is subject to directions issued by the minister for health and aged care on the approval of all state and territory health ministers.

== History ==
The Australian Digital Health agency was formed on 30 January 2016 after declaration of the Public Governance, Performance and Accountability (Establishing the Australian Digital Health Agency) Rule 2016 by Minister for Finance Mathias Cormann, and came into effect on 1 July 2016. The declaration followed the federal 2017–18 federal budget, which announced the formation of a new agency to operate My Health Record. The transition of responsibilities from the former National E-Health Transition Authority was then enacted by Minister for Health Sussan Ley in the Public Governance, Performance and Accountability (Establishing the Australian Digital Health Agency) Transfer Day Notice 2016.

The agency was the first government entity to be created under changes to the Public Governance, Performance and Accountability Act 2013 which allows the federal minister for finance to create federal government agencies without parliamentary passage.

On 4 September 2020, Digital Health announced a new chief executive officer, Amanda Cattermole, who previously was the chief operating officer at Services Australia, the Australian Government agency responsible for welfare payments. Cattermole previously was also the interim chief executive officer for Services Australia, and deputy secretary for health departments for both the federal government and Victoria State Government. Cattermole will begin her role as the chief executive officer on 29 September 2020.

== Digital platforms ==
=== My Health Record ===
My Health Record (MHR) is the national health database for Australia. The Australian Digital Health Agency is the legislative System Operator for the system, meaning they have legal responsibility for the security and access of the platform. Every Australian who didn't opt out by 31 January 2019 or who hasn't deleted their profile, will have a MHR profile created for them and tied to their Medicare profile and Individual Healthcare Identifier. MHR was announced in the 2015–16 federal budget, and the digital health strategy that included MHR was agreed to by all states and territory health ministers in August 2017. MHR is accessible online for patients, or via approved healthcare programs for practitioners or clinical providers.

On 26 November 2018, the Australian federal parliament passed the My Health Records Amendment (Strengthening Privacy) Act 2018 in response to public criticism about the privacy measures of MHR. The act codified privacy policies that: prevent the use of health record data for employment or insurance purposes, prevent law enforcement from accessing data without a court order, authorised patients to completely delete their MHR, reduced the access of parents to the health profiles of under fourteens, increased the penalty for violating healthcare privacy laws, and amongst others, forbids any other government agency from taking operation of MHR (with the exception of the Department of Health and the chief executive of Medicare).

As of July 2020, there are 22.81 million profiles in MHR, accounting for approximately 89.8% of all Australians. There are over 2.16 billion documents uploaded, 15 million Immunisation History Statements, and 1.5 million organ donation preferences. 99% of all pharmacies, 93% of all General Practitioners, and 95% of all public hospitals in Australia are registered to use MHR to access shared information.

=== my health ===
my health is a new mobile app that allows people to directly access their MHR profile from their phone, rather than through myGov on a browser. The app was launched in March 2023 and allows patients to access historic prescriptions, pathology results (7 days after reporting), vaccination history, allergy and reaction information, hospital discharge summaries, and advanced care planning documents.

=== Provider Connect Australia ===
Provider Connect Australia (PCA) is a new digital platform which interfaces with health system providers to share updated information about health staff. Managers can notify services like Medicare, the National Health Services Directory, local hospitals and other public services and agencies about changes to health practitioner details at once, rather than filling out multiple forms per service. This is promoted as reducing the red tape around health workforce movements, such as when new GPs begin at a practice or pharmacists move to a different pharmacy, and supporting better integration between health services.

PCA began rolling out in early March 2023, primarily to GP practices and pharmacies that provide vaccination services. It will later be rolled out to all healthcare organisations in July 2023.

=== Electronic prescriptions ===
Authorised prescribers (such as doctors, nurse practitioners, midwives, and dentists) are able to issue digital prescriptions in Australia. Most pharmacies in Australia are set up to dispense digital prescriptions, with each item receiving a unique prescription token. Digital prescriptions were introduced during the COVID-19 pandemic to support the transition to telehealth models of care. Since May 2020, over 115 million digital prescriptions have been issued by more than 50,000 practitioners.

Patients can elect to activate an Active Scripts List (ASL) by visiting a pharmacy with 100 points of identification. An ASL automatically stores prescription tokens and makes them available for participating pharmacies, rather than having them sent to the person who then needs to bring them to the pharmacy. For a medication to be dispensed from the ASL, the person gives consent to the pharmacy to access the list, who can then dispense medications directly from the stored tokens.

Digital prescriptions also allow for easier prescriber and dispenser reporting to Services Australia who administer the Pharmaceutical Benefits Scheme and Repatriation Pharmaceutical Benefits Scheme.

== See also ==
- Medicare (Australia)
- Department of Health (Australia)
- Health care in Australia
