= Lincolnshire Community Health Services NHS Trust =

NHS community health trust

Lincolnshire Community Health Services is an NHS organisation providing adult and children's community health services, such as district nursing and health visiting, in Lincolnshire. Its headquarters are in Sleaford.

== History ==
The Trust was established in 2011 as part of the Transforming Community Services initiative. In 2024 it joined a group with United Lincolnshire Hospitals NHS Trust and in 2026 it was announced that the two organisations would merge and create a single NHS Trust.

== Services ==
It runs urgent care centres in Skegness and Louth, minor injuries units in Gainsborough and Spalding, a minor illness and injury unit in Peterborough, a walk-in centre in Lincoln and GP Out-of-hours services across the county.

It launched an occupational health musculoskeletal physiotherapy service in February 2015.

The Children's Therapy Service runs a website with advice about child development. They also offer advice and reassurance for parents whose children are starting school.

Macmillan nurses are based at the Trust's Johnson Community Hospital, Spalding.

== Performance ==
It was named by the Health Service Journal as one of the top hundred NHS trusts to work for in 2015. At that time it had 1997 full-time equivalent staff and a sickness absence rate of 4.71%. 72% of staff recommend it as a place for treatment and 56% recommend it as a place to work.

The Care Quality Commission rated it "outstanding" in September 2018. They said that "Without exception all staff were complimentary of the chief executive, his visibility and accessibility and leadership of the trust."
