= RXNT =

Healthcare software company

Networking Technology, Inc.
- Type: Privately held company
- Industry: Healthcare IT; Information technology Health informatics
- Founded: 1999; 27 years ago
- Founder: Randy Boldyga
- Headquarters: Annapolis, Maryland, United States
- Key people: Randy Boldyga, CEO; Thomas Kavukat, CTO
- Products: Electronic health records, Medical Billing Software, Electronic Prescribing Software, Patient portal
- Website: rxnt.com

RXNT (originally Networking Technology, Inc.) is an American privately held healthcare software technology company. The company provides ambulatory practices, hospitals, medical billers, and other healthcare professionals with digital health tools. The company was created in 1999 as a standalone e-prescribing system.

== History ==
Founded in 1999 in Maryland by Randy Boldyga (as Networking Technology Inc.), RXNT initially operated out of a basement to "keep our overhead expenses low" before moving to its first headquarters in 2006. The company has been headquartered in Annapolis since its incorporation on May 27, 1999.

In October 2000, RXNT began beta testing its flagship electronic prescription system with pharmacies and prescribers in the surrounding area before formally launching in 2001.

In December 2003, RXNT received $150,000 in funding from the Anne Arundel County Economic Development Corporation's "Arundel Business Loan Fund" to expand the business.

In November 2007, RXNT was nominated for and received the Anne Arundel Tech Council's "Innovator Award" at the annual TechAwards.

In 2009, RXNT launched Electronic Health Records software. The same year, RXNT was the first product certified in the "CCHIT Certified 2011 Comprehensive" program for stand-alone electronic prescribing (ePrescribing), and in 2014, RXNT launched the first EPCS-certified Electronic Prescribing mobile application for Android devices. In 2017, RXNT EHR version 7.2 achieved the 2015 Edition ONC Health IT certification from the Drummond Group, a testing and compliance organization for the Office of the National Coordinator for Health Information Technology Authorized Certification Body. On February 5, 2026, the company achieved an updated certification for its “RXNT Electronic Health Records” product.

From 2019 to 2022, RXNT was listed on the Inc. 5000 List of Fastest Growing Companies in America.

In July 2025, RXNT launched RXnotify, a medication management, prescription alerts, and pharmacy savings tool.

In November 2025, RXNT launched AI-powered ambient listening and transcription software, Ambient IQ.

== Software ==
RXNT develops, supports, and sells proprietary healthcare software applications with the software-as-a-service (SaaS) model for healthcare professionals, physicians, providers, specialists, and organizations, including Electronic Health Records, Practice management, Patient Scheduling, Medical Billing, Electronic Prescribing, medical Revenue cycle management, and Patient portal.

The e-prescribing system provides information about allergies and potential drug interactions, and medication history.

RXNT began launching AI tools in 2025, focusing on clinical tools like encounter insights and ambient listening.

== Acquisitions ==
In 2004, RXNT acquired Script-Fast Inc, a prescription processing system located in Harrisburg, Pennsylvania.

In October 2024, RXNT acquired Scalabull, a Seattle-based national interfacing network of laboratories and radiology facilities.

== Partnerships ==
RXNT partnered with RxHub LLC in 2002, one of the first electronic Health information exchanges (HIE) in the United States. When Surescripts, operator of the Pharmacy Health Information Exchange, formed the Prescriber Vendor Advisory Council in 2007, COO Mark Wiggins was one of ten executives on the advisory council. After RxHub merged with Surescripts in 2008, RXNT was granted Surescripts Platinum Solution Provider status alongside NextGen EHR.

In 2003, RXNT partnered with Medysis to provide pharmacies with application service provider (ASP) access to electronic prescriptions.

OhioHealth chose RXNT to provide electronic prescription services for its 2,300 member physicians in 2007.

In 2008, RXNT partnered with Medco to offer free e-prescribing training and software during a pilot program of 500 physicians studying the impact of e-prescribing on patient safety, generic drug use, and formulary compliance of the Medicare population.

In 2013, RXNT partnered with FlavoRx in a deal that incorporated recommendations for liquid medications, intended to promote medication adherence for children. The two companies strengthened the partnership in 2015.

In 2022, medical billing and revenue cycle management company American Business Systems announced a partnership with RXNT.

In 2025, RXNT partnered with RxSense—a drug coupon and pharmacy benefit management company—and its prescription savings card brands SingleCare and Paramount Rx to launch RXnotify.

In 2025, RXNT announced a partnership with Kno2, an ehealth exchange, health communication network, and federally designated Qualified Health Information Network (QHIN) under TEFCA.
