= DrChrono =

Health technology company

- Type: Subsidiary
- Industry: Healthcare
- Founded: 2009; 17 years ago
- Founders: Michael Nusimow (CEO); Daniel Kivatinos (COO)
- Headquarters: Sunnyvale, CA, United States
- Products: DrChrono; OnPatient
- Services: Health records
- Parent: EverCommerce
- Website: www.drchrono.com

DrChrono is an American digital health technology company that provides software and billing services on a platform of web apps and cloud-based apps for doctors and patients. The company makes electronic health records (EHR), practice management software, and medical billing software and provides medical revenue cycle management (RCM) services. The company is based in Sunnyvale, California.

Since November 2021, DrChrono has been a wholly-owned subsidiary of EverCommerce (NASDAQ: EVCM), where it operates as part of the company's EverHealth health-services portfolio.

== History ==
DrChrono was founded in New York City in 2009 by Daniel Kivatinos and Michael Nusimow. The company spent time in the Rose Tech Ventures incubator in New York City before moving to Silicon Valley to join Y Combinator. Nusimow, a computer engineer, created the program with the intention of streamlining patient-doctor visits. In February 2011, DrChrono launched as an EHR app for the iPad, allowing doctors to complete tasks and access information without needing to use paper records. The information gathered and accessed through the app is also available from a web browser, iOS and Android devices, on Google Glass, and the Apple Watch.

In June 2011, the company released the first tablet EHR system to be certified for meaningful use by Infogard Laboratories. Doctors who used their EHR app to store and track patient data received up to $44,000 in incentives from federal subsidies. In August 2012, DrChrono released OnPatient, an iOS and Android app to replace and expedite the traditional handwritten patient check-in process. It integrates with DrChrono's medical records interface.

As of December 2018, over $3 billion in medical claims are processed annually through the platform, and 13.2 million patients are under the care of DrChrono providers.

In January 2020, the company raised $20 million in a growth capital round from ORIX Growth Capital, a subsidiary of Orix USA, to invest further in the technology platform (EHR, medical billing, and API) and expand engineering, sales, and support functions.

== Acquisition by EverCommerce ==
On November 2, 2021, EverCommerce Inc., a publicly traded vertical SaaS company, announced a definitive agreement to acquire DrChrono. The acquisition closed on November 18, 2021. Although financial terms were not disclosed in the initial announcement, the deal was reported at approximately $180 million.

At the time of acquisition, DrChrono served more than 4,600 independent medical practices and 13,000 providers across multiple specialties. Following the acquisition, DrChrono joined EverCommerce's EverHealth solutions group and the platform was rebranded as DrChrono by EverHealth.

== Products and software ==
=== DrChrono ===
DrChrono is an electronic health record (EHR) platform using open-source technologies like Linux, Python, MySQL, and Django, built on Apple's iOS. It offers an API for developers to create physician and patient apps. Doctors can manage appointments, records, prescriptions, and labs through customizable interfaces. Paid subscriptions include dictation and billing services. Patients access their records and appointments via iOS, watchOS, and Android apps. The service integrates with Acronis for file exchange and Apollo-plus for revenue cycle management. DrChrono pioneered the first health record system app for Google Glass and integrated with Apple Watch. It was the initial EHR to achieve Electronic Prescriptions for Controlled Substances (EPCS) certification and ONC certification for Meaningful Use Stage 3, enabling data sharing with other certified EHRs.

=== OnPatient ===
OnPatient is a patient-focused app providing health management tools, allowing data import from Google Health. Enables appointment reminders and secure communication with healthcare providers. It is available on Android/iOS.

== Partnerships ==
Many developers have worked with DrChrono to bring include integrated applications to the platform, including CoverMyMeds, FIGmd, Ambra Health, Square, DemandForce, and NextPatient.

In April 2016, DrChrono announced four medical application programming interface partners: Health Gorilla, Inuvio, Medisafe and Wink Health. The partnerships give the DrChrono platform access to US labs for laboratory and imaging orders, streamlined patient data collection, increased access for Medisafe physicians, and integration of sleep studies from a patient's home.

In December 2017, the company partnered with FlexScanMD to help medical practices track inventory.

In 2019, DrChrono announced numerous partnerships, with companies including:

- CoverMyMeds to help expedite insurance authorization processing;
- Beam Health to allow doctors to conduct smartphone video consultations;
- 3D4Medical, to give medical practices access to 3D interactive modeling and animation videos from within their EHR;
- Jamf, to help healthcare practices manage their Apple devices and apps;
- Genomind, to help integrate genetic tests into the app;
- Kapitus, to help healthcare practices secure additional funding;
- DeepScribe, to use artificial intelligence to integrate medical notes directly into their EHR;
- HeathFeed for educational content for providers;
- Updox to consolidate various administrative tasks;
- OutcomeMD, to make it easier to track and analyze patient data.
