= Donald Rucker =

U.S. National Coordinator for Health IT

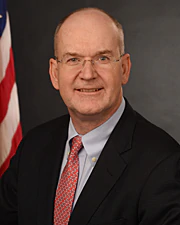

National Coordinator for Health IT
- Incumbent
- Assumed office April 2017
- Preceded by: Jon White (interim)

Personal details
- Education: MD, University of Pennsylvania School of Medicine; MS & MBA, Stanford University
- Alma mater: Harvard College

Donald Rucker is an American medical informatician and emergency physician. In April 2017, he was appointed National Coordinator for Health Information Technology. Currently he serves as the Chief Strategy Officer at health tech startup 1upHealth.

== Career ==
Rucker has practiced emergency medicine in California, Massachusetts, Pennsylvania, and Ohio. He was Beth Israel Deaconess Medical Center's first full-time attending in the emergency department. His teaching background includes 13 years as assistant professor of emergency medicine at University of Pennsylvania Health System and four years, immediately before his appointment to ONC, as professor of emergency medicine and biomedical informatics at Ohio State University.

For 13 years, Rucker was chief medical officer at Siemens Healthcare. He was also CMO for worksite clinic provider Premise Health.

== Awards ==
In 2003, Rucker and his team won the HIMSS Nicholas Davies Award for a computerized provider order entry workflow they designed for Cincinnati Children's Hospital.
