= SCRIPT (medicine) =

SCRIPT is a standard promulgated by the National Council for Prescription Drug Programs (NCPDP) for the electronically transmitted medical prescriptions in the United States.

== Adoption ==
The first version of SCRIPT was approved in 1997. Version 8.1 was proposed as a federal rule by the Centers for Medicare and Medicaid Services (CMS) in November 2007 and adopted in 2008, thereby mandating its use for medical providers that used electronic subscriptions, in order to obtain federal insurance reimbursement. A new "backwards-compatible" version, 10.1, was adopted by the Surescripts pharmacy consortium in late 2009 to facilitate member participation in the electronic medical record incentive programs under the HITECH Act. It was proposed by CMS as a rule in June 2010.
