= Hunt Valley, Maryland =

Unincorporated community in Maryland, United States

- Unincorporated community
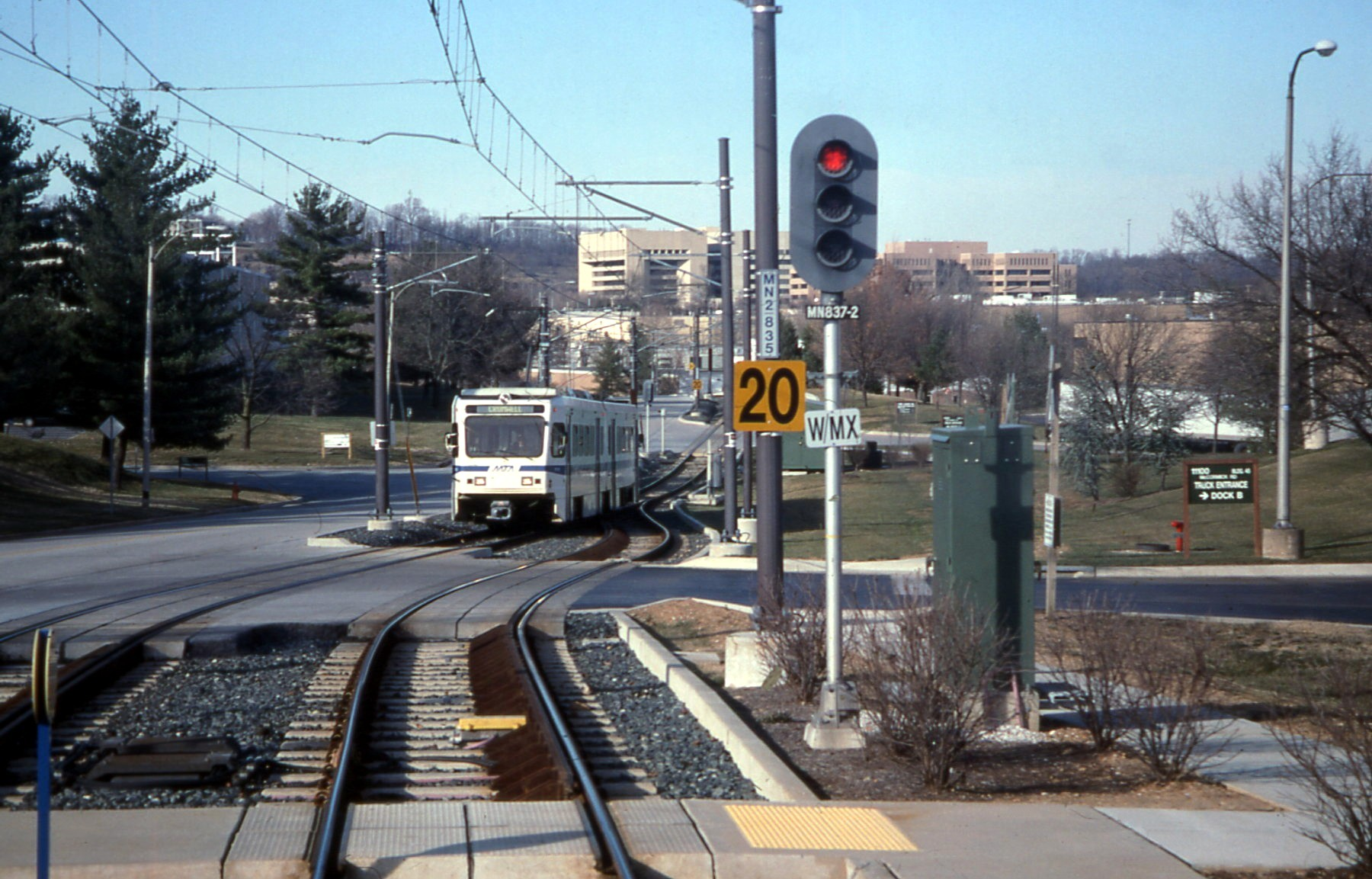
- Hunt Valley, Maryland, as seen from Gilroy Road

- Location in Maryland Hunt Valley (the United States)
- Coordinates: 39°30′12″N 76°42′10″W
- Country: United States
- State: Maryland
- County: Baltimore
- ZIP codes: 21030 & 21031
- Area codes: 410, 443

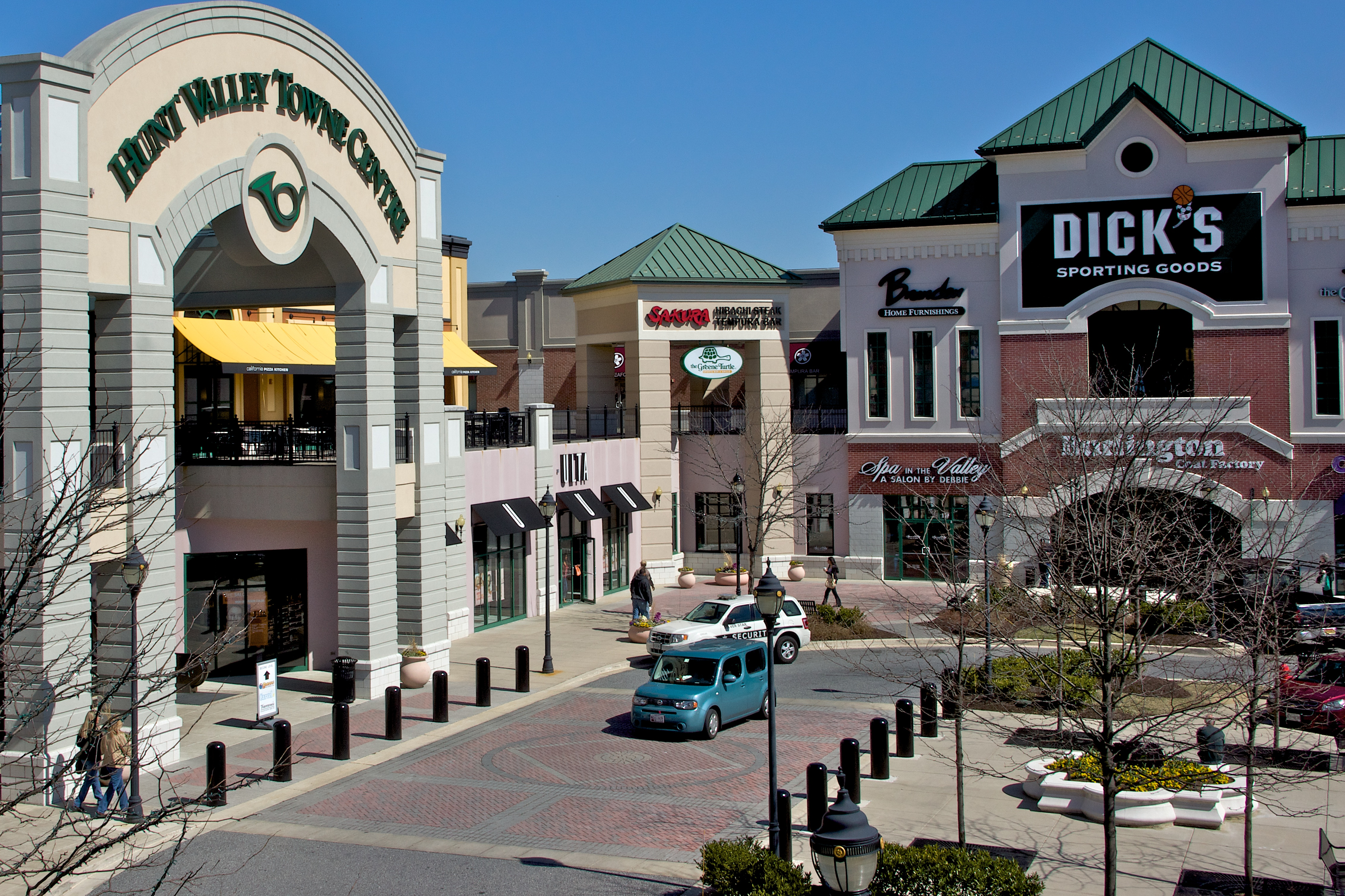
Hunt Valley Towne Centre in Hunt Valley, Maryland

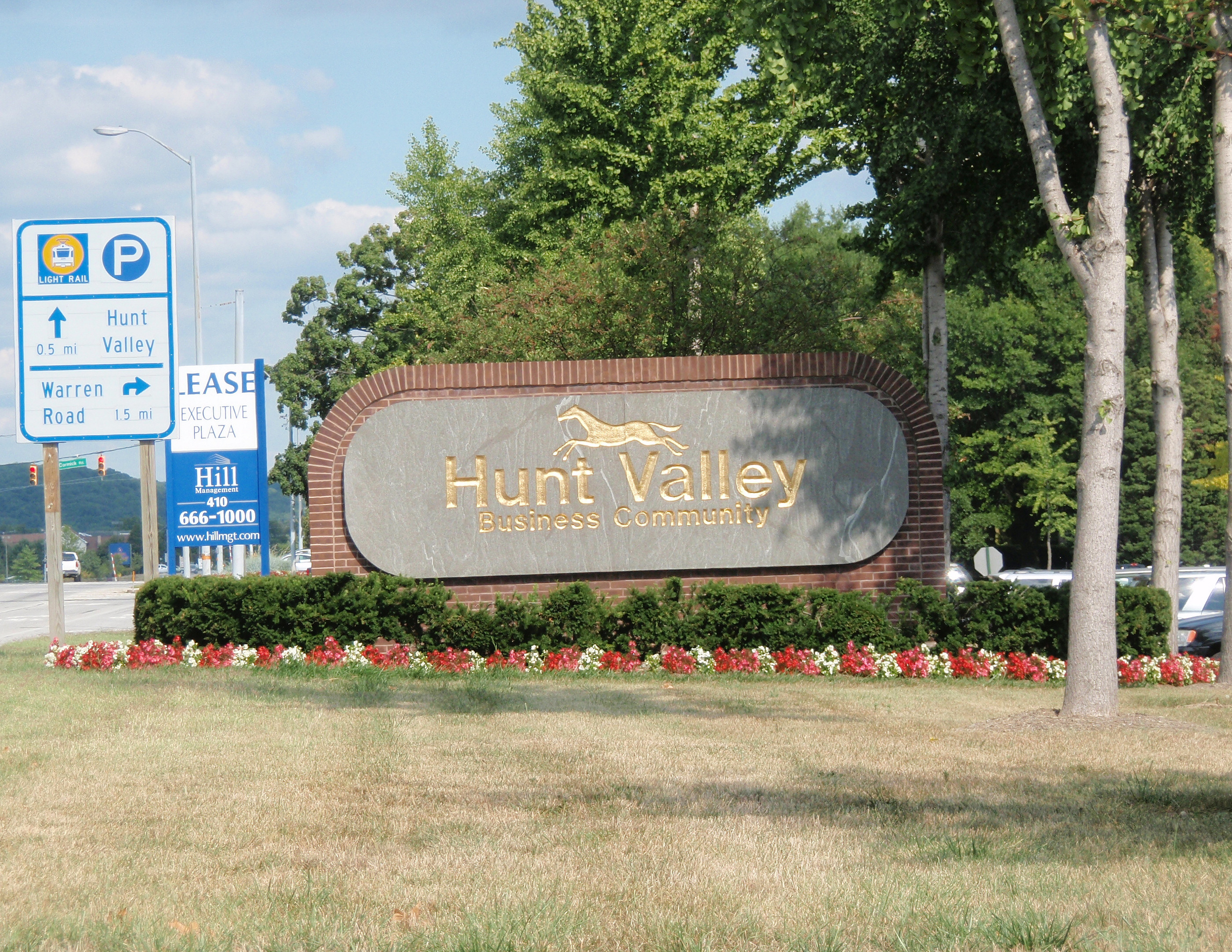
Hunt Valley Business Park in Hunt Valley, Maryland

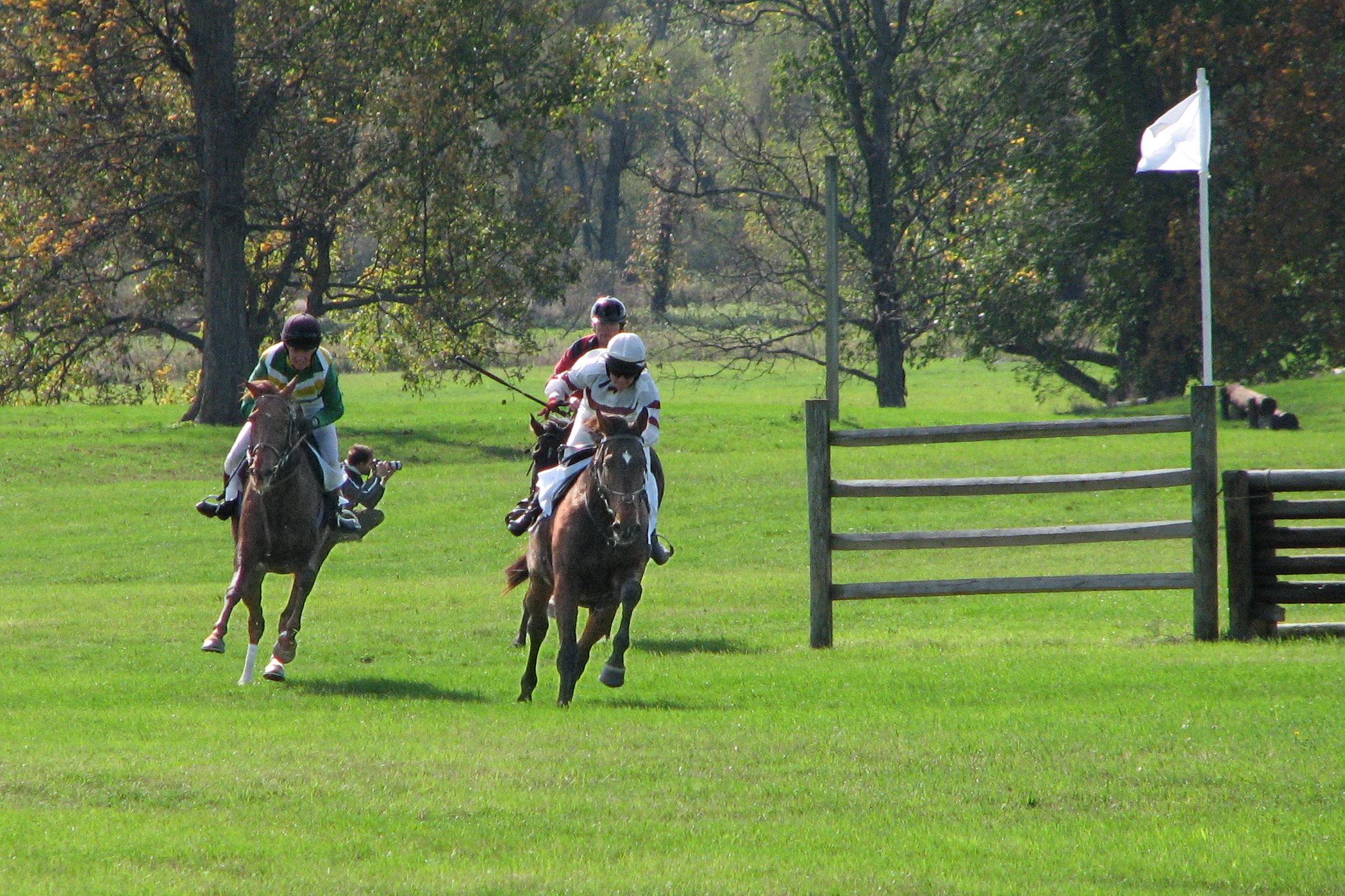
Horse Racing right outside Hunt Valley, Maryland

Hunt Valley is an unincorporated community in Baltimore County, Maryland, United States, near the site of the Maryland Hunt Cup Steeplechase. It lies just north of the city of Baltimore, along York Road (Maryland Route 45), parallel to Interstate 83. The nearby Loch Raven Reservoir is an important landmark and drinking water resource. Its surrounding forested watershed is one of three reservoirs (along with Prettyboy and Liberty Reservoirs) established for the City of Baltimore. Hunt Valley is located at a latitude of 39.5° North and longitude of 76.7° West. It is served by the Cockeysville post office, and is also a neighbor of Timonium. A satellite campus of the Community College of Baltimore County, one of the three supplemental campuses of CCBC, uses a leased building located at 11101 McCormick Road, a business park in Hunt Valley, Maryland.

== Business and industry ==
An industrial park, named The Hunt Valley Business Community, was opened in 1962. Hunt Valley is the home of AmTote International, Inc., Systems Alliance, Inc., BreakAway Games, Atradius North America, Sinclair Broadcast Group, McCormick & Company, AAI Corporation, Dunbar Armored, TESSCO Technologies, ZeniMax Online Studios, and DrChrono. The Hunt Valley Inn has been the site of Balticon in the past.

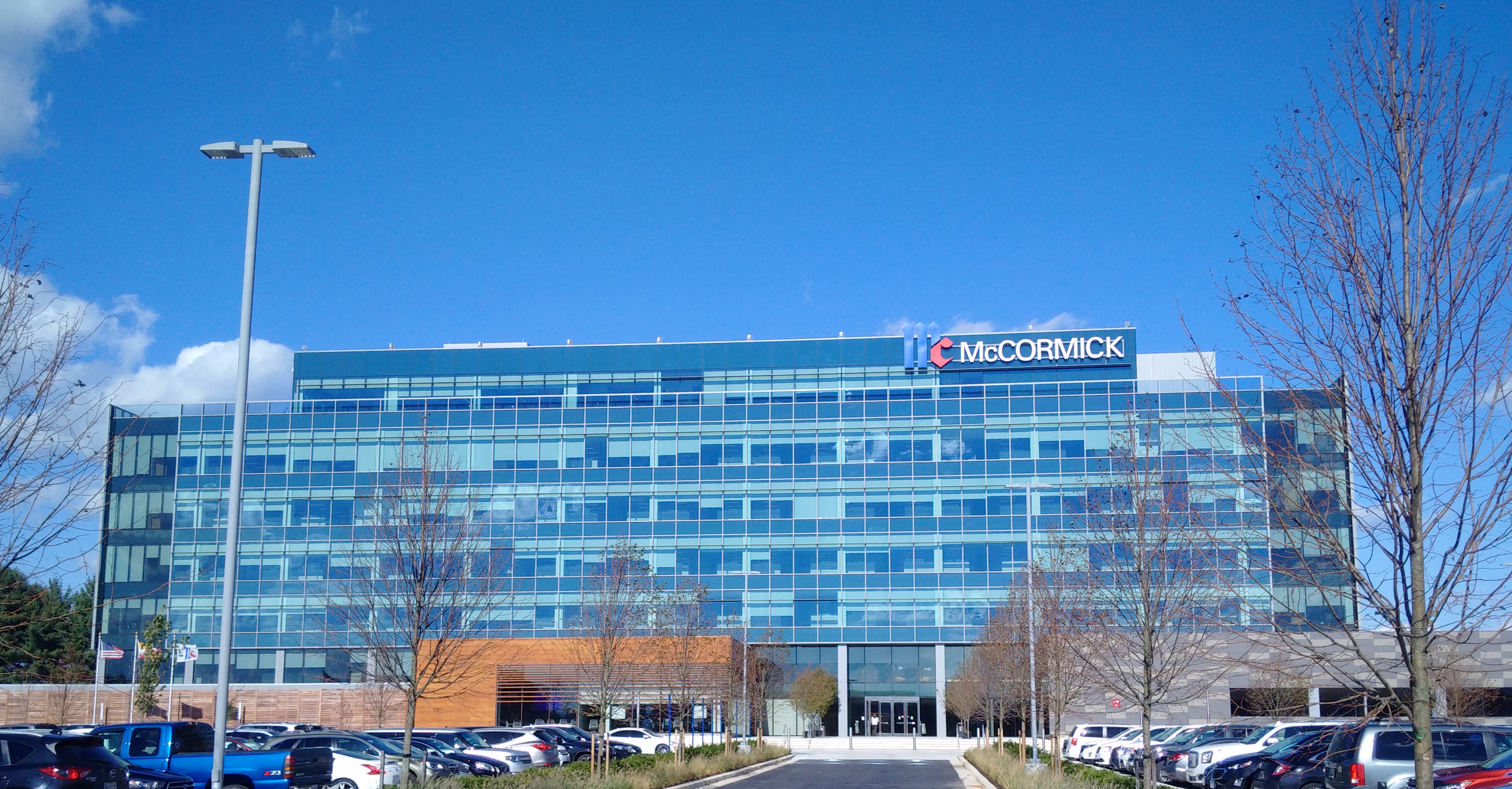
McCormick Hq

Hunt Valley Towne Centre is the main shopping area. It was built on an estate formerly owned by the Grand Lodge of Ancient Free and Accepted Masons of Maryland. Before that, the land was the Merryman family estate, “Bonnie Blink”. It was originally opened as Hunt Valley Mall in 1981, and redeveloped into the current open air Towne Centre in 2005.

== Attractions ==
In 2000 the Maryland Environmental Trust acquired an area encompassing Western Run shoreline, and wetlands, creating a nature preserve and hiking area.

The Torrey C. Brown Rail Trail, also known as the NCR trail, is a hiking trail which passes through Hunt Valley.

The Oregon Ridge Park and Oregon Ridge Nature Center also include hiking trails. The Nature Center hosts an annual bird count.

The System Source Computer Museum houses computing artifacts dating from ancient China to the present day.

== Public transportation ==
Hunt Valley is the northern terminus of the Light Rail line, and is also served by the Route 93 bus.

== Notable people ==
- Peter Mangione (born 2001), soccer player
- Sid Meier (born 1954), video game programmer
