= Robert Kolodner =

2nd U.S. National Coordinator for Health IT

National Coordinator for Health IT
- In office 18 April 2007 – 20 April 2009
- Appointed by: Mike Leavitt
- Preceded by: Karen Bell (interim)
- Succeeded by: David Blumenthal

Acting National Coordinator for Health IT
- In office 18 September 2006 – 18 April 2007

Personal details
- Education: Harvard College (AB); Yale School of Medicine (MD)

Robert Kolodner is an American psychiatrist and medical informatician. In September 2006, he became the second U.S. National Coordinator for Health IT.

== Career ==
Kolodner was chief health informatics officer at the Department of Veterans Affairs (VA) and remained on the VA staff while serving as Acting National Coordinator for Health IT. Health and Human Services Secretary Mike Leavitt officially appointed Kolodner National Coordinator on 18 April 2007. Kolodner served as National Coordinator until David Blumenthal assumed the position on 20 April 2009.

Kolodner retired from the federal government on 23 September 2009.
