= Health Information Technology for Economic and Clinical Health Act =

Title XIII of the American Recovery and Reinvestment Act of 2009

The Health Information Technology for Economic and Clinical Health Act, abbreviated the HITECH Act, was enacted under Title XIII of the American Recovery and Reinvestment Act of 2009 (Pub. L. 111–5 (text) (PDF)). Under the HITECH Act, the United States Department of Health and Human Services (U.S. HHS) resolved to spend $25.9 billion to promote and expand the adoption of health information technology. The Washington Post reported the inclusion of "as much as $36.5 billion in spending to create a nationwide network of electronic health records." At the time it was enacted, it was considered "the most important piece of health care legislation to be passed in the last 20 to 30 years" and the "foundation for health care reform."

The former National Coordinator for Health Information Technology, Farzad Mostashari, has explained: "You need information to be able to do population health management. You can serve an individual quite well; you can deliver excellent customer service if you wait for someone to walk through the door and then you go and pull their chart. What you can't do with paper charts is ask the question, 'Who didn't walk in the door?'"

== Implementation and effects ==
In the years since the law was passed, electronic health records in the United States have become more common, but it is unclear how much of this was caused by the law. The meaningful use incentives in the law only applied to certain types of hospitals. However, a 2017 study suggests that these hospitals did adopt electronic health records more aggressively.

== Subtitle A – Promotion of Health Information Technology ==
=== Part 1 – Improving Health Care Quality, Safety, and Efficiency ===
==== Electronic health records (EHR) ====
The HITECH Act set meaningful use of interoperable EHR adoption in the US healthcare system as a critical national goal and incentivized EHR adoption. The "goal is not adoption alone but 'meaningful use' of EHRs—that is, their use by providers to achieve significant improvements in care."

Title IV of the act promises maximum incentive payments for Medicaid to those who adopt and use "certified EHRs" of $63,750 over 6 years beginning in 2011. Eligible professionals must begin receiving payments by 2016 to qualify for the program. For Medicare, the maximum payments are $44,000 over 5 years. Doctors who do not adopt an EHR by 2015 will be penalized 1% of Medicare payments, increasing to 3% over 3 years. The HITECH Act (ARRA) requires doctors to show "meaningful use" of an EHR system to receive the EHR stimulus money. As of June 2010, there are no penalty provisions for Medicaid.

Health information exchange (HIE) has emerged as a core capability for hospitals and physicians to achieve "meaningful use" and receive stimulus funding. Starting in 2015, hospitals and doctors will be subject to financial penalties under Medicare if they are not using electronic health records.

===== Meaningful use =====
The main components of meaningful use are:

- The use of a certified EHR in a meaningful manner, such as e-prescribing.
- The use of certified EHR technology for electronic exchange of health information to improve quality of health care.
- The use of certified EHR technology to submit clinical quality and other measures.

In other words, providers need to demonstrate their use of certified EHR technology in ways that can be measured significantly in quality and in quantity.

The meaningful use of EHRs intended by the US government incentives is categorized as follows:

- Improve care coordination
- Reduce healthcare disparities
- Engage patients and their families
- Improve population and public health
- Ensure adequate privacy and security

The Obama Administration's Health IT program intended to use federal investments to stimulate the market of electronic health records through the use of:

- Incentives: to providers who use IT
- Strict and open standards: To ensure users and sellers of EHRs work towards the same goal
- Certification of software: To provide assurance that the EHRs meet basic quality, safety, and efficiency standards

The detailed definition of "meaningful use" was rolled out in 3 stages. Details of each stage were hotly debated by various groups. Stage 1 was finalized in July 2010, Stage 2 in August 2012, and Stage 3 in October 2015.

===== Meaningful use Stage 1 =====
The first steps in achieving meaningful use are to have a certified EHR and to be able to demonstrate that it is being used to meet the requirements. Stage 1 contains 25 objectives/measures for Eligible Providers (EPs) and 24 objectives/measures for eligible hospitals. The objectives/measures have been divided into a core set and menu set. EPs and eligible hospitals must meet all objectives/measures in the core set (15 for EPs and 14 for eligible hospitals). EPs must meet 5 of the 10 menu-set items during Stage 1, one of which must be a public health objective.

Full list of the Core Requirements and a full list of the Menu Requirements:

Core Requirements:

1. Use computerized order entry for medication orders.
2. Implement drug-drug, drug-allergy checks.
3. Generate and transmit permissible prescriptions electronically.
4. Record demographics.
5. Maintain an up-to-date problem list of current and active diagnoses.
6. Maintain active medication list.
7. Maintain active medication allergy list.
8. Record and chart changes in vital signs.
9. Record smoking status for patients 13 years old or older.
10. Implement one clinical decision support rule.
11. Report ambulatory quality measures to CMS or the States.
12. Provide patients with an electronic copy of their health information upon request.
13. Provide clinical summaries to patients for each office visit.
14. Capability to exchange key clinical information electronically among providers and patient-authorized entities.
15. Protect electronic health information (privacy & security).

Menu Requirements:

1. Implement drug-formulary checks.
2. Incorporate clinical lab test results into certified EHR as structured data.
3. Generate lists of patients by specific conditions to use for quality improvement, reduction of disparities, research, and outreach.
4. Send reminders to patients per patient preference for preventive/follow-up care
5. Provide patients with timely electronic access to their health information (including lab results, problem list, medication lists, allergies).
6. Use a certified EHR to identify patient-specific education resources and provide them to patients if appropriate.
7. Perform medication reconciliation as relevant.
8. Provide summary care record for transitions in care or referrals.
9. Capability to submit electronic data to immunization registries and actual submission.
10. Capability to provide electronic syndromic surveillance data to public health agencies and actual transmission.

To receive federal incentive money, CMS requires participants in the Medicare EHR Incentive Program to "attest" that during a 90-day reporting period, they used a certified EHR and met Stage 1 criteria for meaningful use objectives and clinical quality measures. For the Medicaid EHR Incentive Program, providers follow a similar process using their state's attestation system.

In 2017, the government for the first time charged an EHR vendor with falsely representing to customers and the government that its EHR system met the requirements for meaningful use. eClinicalWorks agreed to pay $155 million to settle government charges and a "qui tam" lawsuit brought by a whistleblower who implemented eClinicalWorks' system at Rikers Island Correctional Facility in New York City. The government also alleged that eClinicalWorks paid kickbacks for referrals. The government also reached separate settlement agreements with three eClinicalWorks employees to pay the government a total of $80,000 to settle civil allegations.

==== National Coordinator for Health Information Technology (HIT) ====
The Office of the National Coordinator for Health Information Technology (ONC) is established within the Department of Health and Human Services. The National Coordinator is appointed by the Secretary and reports directly to the Secretary.

The National Coordinator is responsible for the development of the Nationwide Health Information Network.

==== HIT Policy Committee ====
The HIT Policy Committee recommends a policy framework for the development and adoption of a nationwide health information technology infrastructure that permits the electronic exchange and use of health information.

==== HIT Standards Committee ====
The HIT Standards Committee recommends to the National Coordinator standards, implementation specifications, and certification criteria. The Standards Committee also harmonizes, pilot tests, and ensures consistency with the Social Security Act.

== Subtitle B – Testing of Health Information Technology ==
Subtitle B of the HITECH Act established a framework for the testing and certification of health information technology used in the United States healthcare system. The provisions were intended to support the adoption of interoperable electronic health records (EHRs) by ensuring that certified systems met standardized functional, security, and interoperability requirements.

Under the HITECH Act, ONC developed the ONC Health IT Certification Program, which established certification criteria for EHR technology used in federal incentive programs. Healthcare providers participating in the Medicare and Medicaid EHR Incentive Programs were generally required to use certified EHR technology in order to qualify for incentive payments associated with meaningful use.

The certification framework included testing for capabilities such as electronic prescribing, clinical quality measure reporting, privacy and security controls, and health information exchange using standardized formats and protocols. Accredited Testing Laboratories (ATLs) and Authorized Certification Bodies (ACBs) were approved by ONC to perform testing and certification activities.

Over time, certification requirements expanded to include interoperability standards such as the Fast Healthcare Interoperability Resources (FHIR) standard and application programming interfaces (APIs) intended to support patient access and data exchange.

Critics of the certification program argued that some certified EHR systems remained difficult to use and did not consistently achieve practical interoperability despite meeting formal certification requirements. Others argued that the testing and certification process helped establish a national baseline for EHR functionality and accelerated the digitization of healthcare records in the United States.

== Subtitle D – Privacy ==
=== Part 1 – Improved Privacy Provisions and Security Provisions ===
The HITECH Act requires entities covered by the Health Insurance Portability and Accountability Act (HIPAA) to report data breaches that affect 500 or more persons to the United States Department of Health and Human Services (U.S. HHS), to the news media, and to the people affected by the data breaches. This subtitle extends the complete Privacy and Security Provisions of HIPAA to the business associates of covered entities. This includes the extension of updated civil and criminal penalties to the pertinent business associates. These changes are also required to be included in any business associate agreements (BAAs) among the covered entities. On November 30, 2009, the regulations associated with the enhancements to HIPAA enforcement took effect. The HITECH Act established a four-tiered civil monetary penalty structure for HIPAA violations based on the level of culpability, ranging from $100 per violation for violations in which the covered entity was unaware and could not have reasonably known of the violation, to a minimum of $50,000 per violation for violations attributable to willful neglect that are not corrected within 30 days, with an annual cap of $1,500,000 for all violations of an identical provision. In 2019, HHS exercised enforcement discretion to apply separate annual penalty caps to each tier, reducing the maximum annual penalty for the lowest-culpability tier to $25,000 and for reasonable-cause violations to $100,000.

Another significant change brought about by Subtitle D of the HITECH Act is the new breach notification requirements. This imposes new notification requirements on covered entities, business associates, vendors of personal health records (PHR) and related entities if a breach of unsecured protected health information (PHI) occurs. On April 27, 2009, the Department of Health and Human Services (HHS) issued guidance on how to secure protected health information appropriately. Both HHS and the Federal Trade Commission (FTC) were required under the HITECH Act to issue regulations associated with the new breach notification requirements. The HHS rule was published in the Federal Register on August 24, 2009, and the FTC rule was published on August 25, 2009.

The final significant change made in Subtitle D of the HITECH Act implements new rules for the accounting of disclosures of a patient's health information. It extends the current accounting for disclosure requirements to information that is used to carry out treatment, payment and healthcare operations when an organization is using an electronic health record (EHR). This new requirement also limits the timeframe for the accounting to three years instead of six as it currently stands. These changes took effect January 1, 2011 for organizations implementing EHRs between January 1, 2009 and January 1, 2011, and January 1, 2013, for organizations that had implemented an EHR prior to January 1, 2009.

Subtitle D also includes a "third-party directive" stating that individuals have the right to obtain a copy of their health information in an electronic format and, if the individual chooses, to direct the covered entity to transmit such copy directly to an entity or person designated by the individual. Although HHS had interpreted the statutory cap on the provision of medical records to an individual to apply to medical records delivered under the third-party directive, a 2020 decision by the United States District Court for the District of Columbia voided that regulation on the grounds that it had not gone through notice and comment.

On January 25, 2013, HHS published the HIPAA Omnibus Rule, which finalized the remaining HITECH Act provisions and replaced four previously issued interim and proposed rules. The Omnibus Rule made business associates directly liable for compliance with the HIPAA Security Rule, replaced the interim breach notification "risk of harm" standard with a more objective assessment, and prohibited the sale of protected health information without patient authorization.

On July 14, 2010, HHS issued a rule that listed categories that included 701,325 entities and 1.5 million business associates who would have access to patient information without patient consent after the patient had given general consent to their medical practitioner's HIPAA release.

In January 2024, HHS finalized amendments to 42 CFR Part 2, which governs the confidentiality of substance use disorder (SUD) treatment records, to align these protections with the HITECH Act's breach notification framework. The final rule, implementing Section 3221 of the CARES Act, extends HITECH's breach notification requirements to Part 2 records, meaning that unauthorized disclosures of SUD treatment information now trigger the same notification obligations that apply to other protected health information under HIPAA and HITECH. The rule also aligns Part 2's civil and criminal penalty structure with the tiered enforcement framework established by the HITECH Act, and permits HIPAA-covered entities and business associates to redisclose Part 2 records consistent with HIPAA rules. Compliance was required by February 16, 2026.

== See also ==
- Omnibus Rule
- Common rule
