= Farzad Mostashari =

Former U.S. government official and businessman

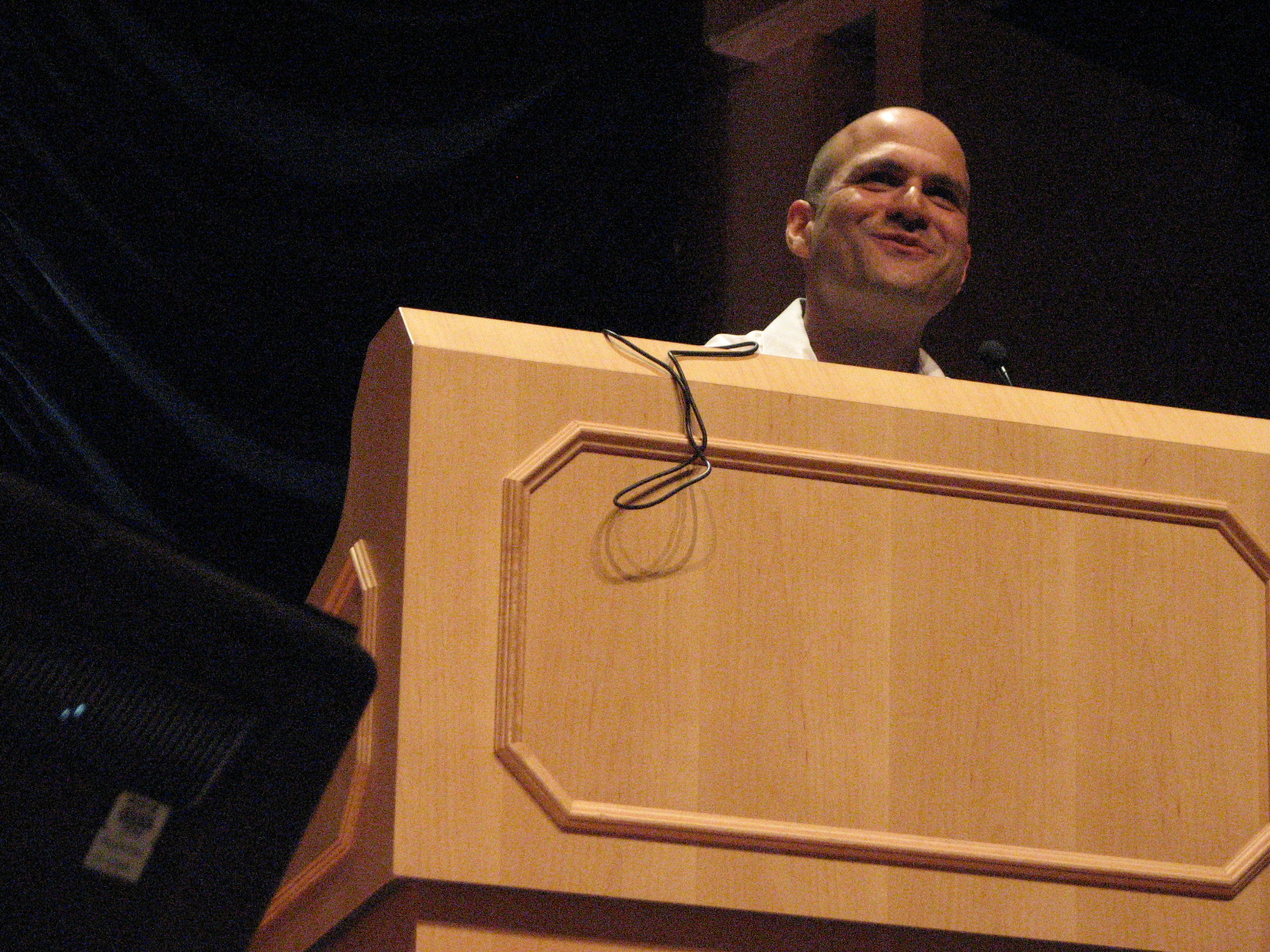
- Farzad Mostashari

National Coordinator for Health Information Technology
- Preceded by: David Blumenthal
- Succeeded by: Karen DeSalvo

Personal details
- Born: 1968 or 1969 (age 57–58) Richmond, Virginia
- Education: Harvard University, Harvard T.H. Chan School of Public Health, Yale University School of Medicine

Farzad Mostashari (born 1968/69), MD, ScM, is the former national coordinator for health information technology at the U.S. Department of Health and Human Services.

Since its inception, Mostashari has been the CEO of Aledade, a company which he founded in 2014. Aledade provides services to independent primary care providers forming accountable care organizations.

== Life ==
He was born in Richmond, Virginia, and raised in Iran, Mostashari moved to upstate New York at age 14.

Mostashari holds degrees from Yale University School of Medicine (MD, Medicine, 1996), Harvard T.H. Chan School of Public Health (MSc, Population Health, 1991), and Harvard University (AB, Biochemistry, 1989).

== Career ==
Mostashari completed his residency in internal medicine at Massachusetts General Hospital. He later joined the Centers for Disease Control and Prevention's Epidemiological Intelligence Service, where he investigated outbreaks of infectious disease. He then joined the New York City Department of Health, where he launched the primary care information project under Thomas Frieden. The project focused on accelerating the adoption of electronic health record systems as a means of improving primary care quality in New York City. Following the passage of the HITECH act, David Blumenthal recruited Mostashari to serve as deputy national coordinator for health information technology in July 2009 and eventually succeeded him as national coordinator on 8 April 2011. Mostashari oversaw the design and implementation of Stage 1 of the Meaningful Use program. In August 2013, he announced his resignation, and following his departure, he became a visiting fellow at the Brookings Institution's Engelberg Center for Health Care Reform. He used his time at Brookings to develop the ideas that he used to found Aledade.

With Martin Kulldorff, Mostashari developed SaTScan, a free software program used for geographical and hospital disease surveillance.

== See also ==
- Office of the National Coordinator for Health Information Technology
