= David Blumenthal =

Physician and health care policy expert

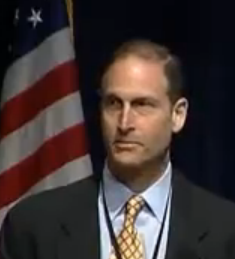
- Born: August 31, 1948 (age 77); Brooklyn, New York, United States
- Education: Harvard University (BA, MD, MPP)
- Spouse: Ellen Gravitz Blumenthal (m. 1974)
- Children: 2

David Blumenthal (born August 31, 1948) is an American academic physician and healthcare policy expert, who served as the National Coordinator for Health Information Technology from 2009 to 2011 during the early implementation of the Health Information Technology for Economic and Clinical Health Act provisions on "meaningful use".

== Early life and education ==
Blumenthal was born in Brooklyn, the son of Jane M. (née Rosenstock) and Martin A. Blumenthal, the president of a commodities trading firm. His mother was born in Omaha, Nebraska, to a Jewish family that originated in Prussia and Baden, and his father was a Jewish immigrant from Frankfurt, Germany.

Blumenthal received his B.A. from Harvard College (1970), his M.D. from Harvard Medical School (1975), and his M.P.P. from Harvard Kennedy School (1975). His internship and residency were at the Massachusetts General Hospital from 1975 to 1980.

Blumenthal was associate physician at Brigham and Women's Hospital, Boston (1987 to 1991) and then associate physician at Massachusetts General Hospital from 1991, physician from 1997.

== Academic career ==
Blumenthal was a lecturer of health policy at the Kennedy School of Government from 1980 to 1987. He was an instructor, then professor, of medicine, social medicine and health policy, and of health care policy at the Harvard Medical School from 1980 and also a lecturer on health services, health policy and management at the Harvard School of Public Health from 1983.

== Policy activities ==
Blumenthal was a professional staff member to the U.S. Senate Committee on Human Resources health and scientific research subcommittee in 1977 to 1979. He became chief of the Health Policy Research and Development Unit at Massachusetts General Hospital in 1991 and director of the Institute for Health Policy for the Massachusetts General Hospital and Partners HealthCare System in 1988. From 2002, he was national correspondent for the New England Journal of Medicine.

== Campaign and governmental activities ==
During the U.S. presidential campaign in 1987-1988, Blumenthal was chief health advisor to the Dukakis campaign. Twenty years later, in 2008, he was senior health adviser to the Obama campaign. On March 20, 2009, President Obama appointed Blumenthal to be the National Health Information Technology Coordinator, just a month after the enactment of a federal stimulus package that included about $19 billion in incentives, by Medicare and Medicaid, for the adoption of electronic health records.

Blumenthal's charge was to set enabling policy for a nationwide health information system and to support widespread meaningful use of health information technology. By many reports, he succeeded in putting in place one of the largest publicly funded infrastructure investments the US ever made in such a short time period, in any field. In 2010, he was named by Modern Healthcare as the most influential physician executive in the U.S. In February 2011, Blumenthal announced that he would leave the post of National Coordinator that spring; on April 8, Farzad Mostashari was announced as his successor.

== Personal life ==
David Blumenthal married Ellen Gravitz Blumenthal on August 9, 1970. They have two children. Blumenthal's older brother, Richard, is a United States senator from Connecticut.
