= National Council for Prescription Drug Programs =

American pharmacy industry standards development organization

The National Council for Prescription Drug Programs (NCPDP) is an American nonprofit standards development organization representing most sectors of the U.S. pharmacy services industry. It was founded in 1977 as the extension of a Drug Ad Hoc Committee that made recommendations for the U.S. National Drug Code (NDC). It is based in Scottsdale, Arizona.

NCPDP has been named in U.S. federal legislation, including the Health Insurance Portability and Accountability Act (HIPAA) and the Medicare Prescription Drug, Improvement, and Modernization Act. NCPDP members have created standards such as the Telecommunication Standard and Batch Standard, the SCRIPT standard for electronic prescribing, the Manufacturers Rebate Standard, and more to improve communication within the pharmacy industry.

== Members ==
NCPDP participants include most segments involved in the pharmacy services sector of healthcare. The membership is in three categories:

- Producer/Provider: includes all types of retail pharmacies (including chains, independents, and online pharmacies), pharmaceutical manufacturers, and long-term care providers.
- Payer/Processor: includes pharmacy benefit management companies, health insurers, state and federal agencies, and health maintenance organizations.
- Vendor/General Interest: includes healthcare consultants, systems vendors, database management organizations, physician service organizations, professional/trade associations, and wholesale drug distributors.
