= Howard Koh =

American physician (born 1952)

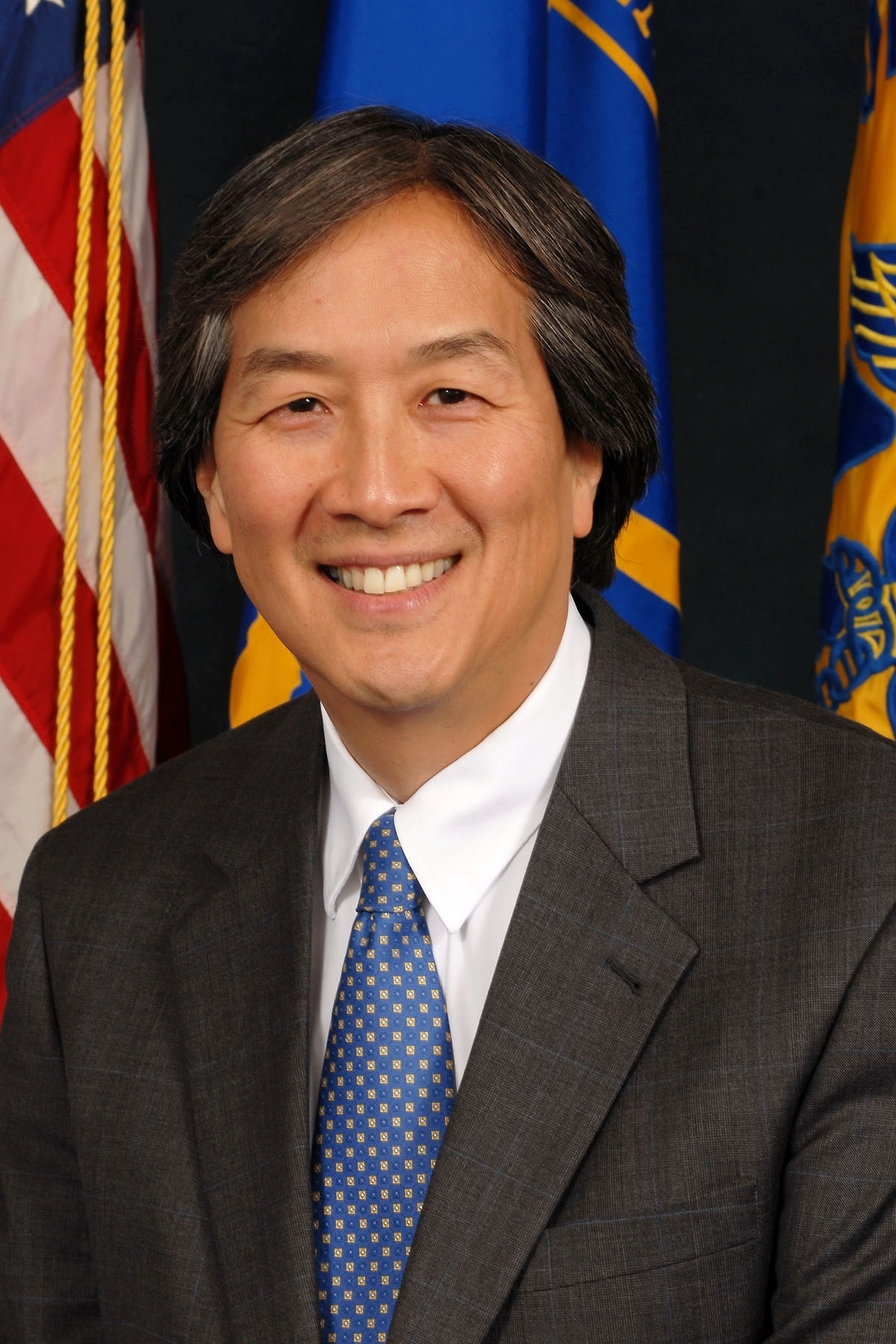
- Official portrait, 2009

15th Assistant Secretary for Health
- In office June 22, 2009 – July 31, 2014
- President: Barack Obama
- Preceded by: Steven Galson (acting)
- Succeeded by: Karen DeSalvo (acting)

Personal details
- Born: March 15, 1952 (age 74) Boston, Massachusetts, U.S.
- Spouse: Claudia Arrigg (m. 1981)
- Children: 3, including Daniel
- Relatives: Harold Hongju Koh (brother)
- Education: Yale University (BA, MD); Boston University (MPH)

Howard Kyongju Koh (Hangul: 고경주, Hanja: 高京柱; born March 15, 1952) is the former assistant secretary for health for the U.S. Department of Health and Human Services (HHS), after being nominated by President Barack Obama and confirmed by the U.S. Senate in 2009.

== Early life and education ==
Koh was born in 1952 to a Korean family in Connecticut. His father was a professor at Central Connecticut State College and his mother was an administrator at Yale University. Koh has seven siblings, including Harold Hongju Koh, the former Legal Adviser of the Department of State and Dean of Yale Law School.

Koh graduated from Yale College in 1973, where he was president of the Yale Glee Club, and Yale University School of Medicine in 1977. He completed postgraduate training at Boston City Hospital and Massachusetts General Hospital, serving as chief resident in both hospitals. He has earned board certification in four medical fields: internal medicine, hematology, medical oncology, and dermatology, as well as a Master of Public Health degree from Boston University School of Public Health in 1995.

== Career ==
At Boston University Schools of Medicine and Public Health, he was Professor of Dermatology, Medicine and Public Health as well as Director of Cancer Prevention and Control.

As the Assistant Secretary for Health, Koh oversaw the HHS Office of Public Health and Science, the Commissioned Corps of the U.S. Public Health Service, and the Office of the Surgeon General. He also served as senior public health advisor to the Secretary. At the Office of Public Health and Science, he led an array of interdisciplinary programs relating to disease prevention, health promotion, the reduction of health disparities, women’s and minority health, HIV/AIDS, vaccine programs, physical fitness and sports, bioethics, population affairs, blood supply, research integrity and human research protections. In these various roles, he was dedicated to the mission of creating better public health systems for prevention and care so that all people can reach their highest attainable standard of health. He announced his resignation at the end of July 2014.

Koh previously served as the Harvey V. Fineberg Professor of the Practice of Public Health, Associate Dean for Public Health Practice, and Director of the Division of Public Health Practice at the Harvard School of Public Health. At Harvard, he also served as the principal investigator of multiple research grants related to community-based participatory research, cancer disparities affecting underserved and minority populations, tobacco control and emergency preparedness. He was also Director of the Harvard School of Public Health Center for Public Health Preparedness, which promotes education about bioterrorism, pandemic influenza, and other emerging health threats. He has published over 200 articles in the medical and public health literature.

Koh served as Commissioner of Public Health for the Commonwealth of Massachusetts (1997–2003) after being appointed by Governor William Weld. As Commissioner, Koh led the Massachusetts Department of Public Health, which included a wide range of health services, four hospitals, and a staff of more than 3,000 professionals. In this capacity, he emphasized the power of prevention and strengthened the state’s commitment to eliminating health disparities. During his service, the state saw advances in areas such as tobacco control, cancer screening, bioterrorism response after the September 11 attacks in 2001 and anthrax, health issues of the homeless, newborn screening, organ donation, suicide prevention and international public health partnerships.

== Awards and honors ==
He has earned numerous awards and honors for interdisciplinary accomplishments in medicine and public health, including the Distinguished Service Award from the American Cancer Society, the Drs. Jack E. White/LaSalle D. Leffall Cancer Prevention Award from the American Association for Cancer Research and the Intercultural Cancer Council, and the Dr. Harold P. Freeman Lectureship Award. He is an elected member of the Institute of Medicine of the National Academies. President Bill Clinton appointed Koh as a member of the National Cancer Advisory Board (2000–2002). A past Chair of the Massachusetts Coalition for a Health Future (the group that pushed for the Commonwealth’s groundbreaking tobacco control initiative), Koh was named by the New England Division of the American Cancer Society as “one of the most influential persons in the fight against tobacco during the last 25 years”. Other awards include being named to the K100 (the 100 leading Korean Americans in the first century of Korean immigration to the United States), the Boston University School of Public Health Distinguished Alumni Award (the highest award of the School), the Sedgwick Memorial Medal of the American Public Health Association (2014) and an honorary degree from Merrimack College. In recognition of his national contributions to the field of early detection and prevention of melanoma, the Boston Red Sox designated him a “Medical All Star” (2003) which included the ceremonial first pitch at Fenway Park.

== Personal life ==
In 1981, Koh married ophthalmologist Claudia Arrigg from Andover, Massachusetts. Arrigg's grandparents had come to Massachusetts from Lebanon in the 1890s. The couple have three children. Their elder son Steven is a professor at Boston University School of Law. Their middle son, Daniel, was chief of staff to Marty Walsh, and was elected to the U. S. House of Representatives on November 3, 2026 Their daughter, Katherine, is a doctor at Massachusetts General Hospital.

Political offices
Preceded by Steven Galson; Acting	Assistant Secretary for Health; 2009–2014	Succeeded by Karen DeSalvo; Acting
