= Medisafe International =

UK medical device company

- Company type: Private
- Industry: Medical devices
- Founded: 1991
- Headquarters: Bishop's Stortford, UK
- Number of employees: Worldwide
- Website: www.medisafeinternational.com

Medisafe International is a United Kingdom-based company that develops and manufactures products in the field of surgical instrument reprocessing. In 1985, Medisafe introduced the Sonic Irrigation technology to the medical device market. The company has a representation with manufacturing sites in the UK and offices in Florida, Hamburg, Oslo, Buenos Aires and Malta.

== History ==
Established in 1991, Medisafe is a specialist manufacturer of stainless steel medical equipment, which has been working in the instrument reprocessing area since 1985. As of 2009, Medisafe had five factories in the UK and sales to over 60 countries. The company provides numerous machines, instrument care products and cleaning chemistries in healthcare facilities.

In 1999, Medisafe America LLC was opened to cover the US market from its base in Florida, followed by Medisafe Germany GmbH in 2002. These operate as sales service and support operations. There is also a regional office in Norway. The base in Oslo manages the Scandinavian/Japanese markets.

In 2005, a new in house research and development facility was opened in the UK to increase the speed control and flexibility over new product design. 3D CAD technology is used to validate designs before prototyping and then manufacture.

== See also ==
- Instruments used in general surgery
