= IMedicor =

iMedicor
- Website type: Social network service
- Owners: Vemics, Inc.
- Creators: Vemics, Inc.
- Website: www.imedicor.com
- Launched: October, 2007

The iMedicor Web portal, which went live on October 10, 2007, is online personal health data exchange and secure messaging portal for physician collaboration, community and referrals. iMedicor reached its 32,000th physician registration on December 12, 2007. It has been discussed in such journals as Healthcare Informatics, Advance for Health Information Professionals, Virtual Medical Worlds, and Highway Hypodermics among others and received positive review by the Internet journal Medgadget.

The portal's HIPAA-compliant technology and ability to enable health providers to exchange medical record data, documentation and images distinguish it from chat-room-style portals for the medical community. The launch of iMedicor's portal coincides with the entrance of Microsoft's Healthvault and Google Health into the personal health record space.

Some of iMedicor's partner associations include the Association of Black Cardiologists (ABC), the American Society for Hypertension (ASH), and the Hypertrophic Cardiomyopathy Association (HCA).
