= Karen DeSalvo =

American government official (born 1966)

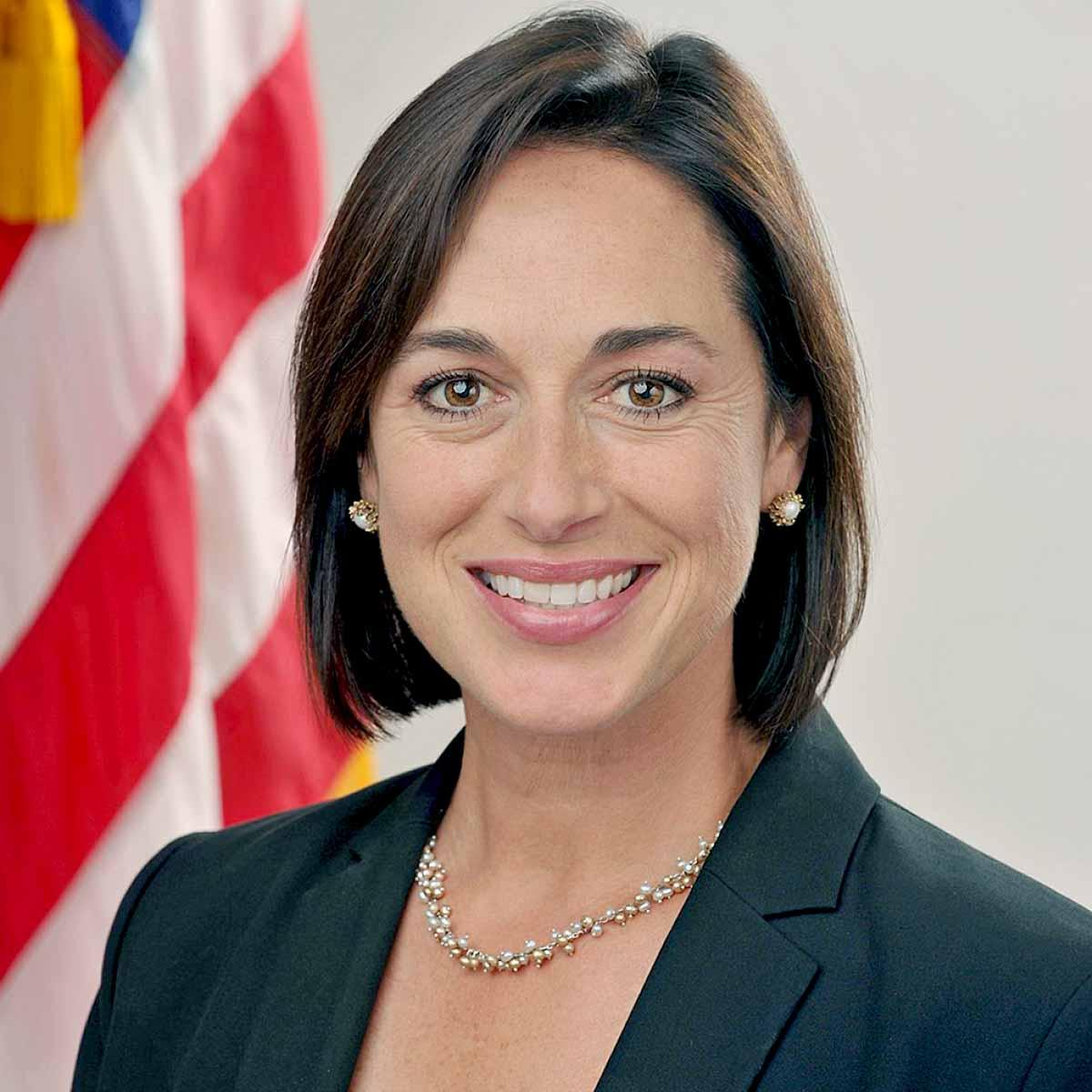

Assistant Secretary for Health
- Acting
- In office October 2014 – January 3, 2017
- President: Barack Obama
- Preceded by: Howard Koh
- Succeeded by: Don J. Wright (acting)

Personal details
- Born: August 4, 1966 (age 59)
- Education: Suffolk University (BA); Tulane University (MPH, MD); Harvard University (MS)

Karen Bollinger DeSalvo (born August 4, 1966) is an American business executive, physician and public health expert. She has been Google’s chief health officer since 2019. Previously, she served as the Acting Assistant Secretary for Health, National Coordinator for Health Information Technology, and Director of the Office of the National Coordinator for Health Information Technology (ONC).

== Career ==
DeSalvo received her MD and MPH from Tulane University, and subsequently served as Vice Dean for Community Affairs and Health Policy there.

DeSalvo served as New Orleans Health Commissioner from 2011 until 2014, and New Orleans Mayor Mitchell Landrieu’s Senior Health Policy Advisor.

In her role as National Coordinator for health information technology from January 2014 until August 2016, DeSalvo reported directly to Sylvia Mathews Burwell, Secretary of HHS.

Beginning in October 2014 DeSalvo served as an acting Assistant Secretary for Health in the U.S. Department of Health and Human Services and on May 7, 2015, she was officially nominated. right before her nomination was set to expire on January 3, 2016, the Senate designated it for carryover to the next Congressional session. On August 11, 2016, it was announced that DeSalvo was resigning as head of the National Coordinator for Health IT to focus on her duties as Acting Assistant Secretary of Health. On January 1, 2016, she was allowed to continue serving as the Acting Assistant Secretary for Health under 5 U.S.C. § 3346(b)(2), as her nomination was being held in the Senate due to the Affordable Care Act stripping some families access to Consumer Operation and Oriented Program (CO-OP). The Senate eventually returned her nomination to the President without action on January 3, 2017. DeSalvo left the Assistant Secretary post in January 2017.

Between 2017 and 2019, she taught at the University of Texas at Austin's Dell Medical School. She was elected to the Humana Inc. board in November 2017. On October 15, 2019, Humana disclosed that DeSalvo was leaving the board that day to avoid the appearance of a conflict of interest, in connection with an unknown opportunity. On October 17, 2019, Google appointed DeSalvo its new chief health officer, a newly created role.

== Boards ==
By late 2019, DeSalvo was on several medical boards, and had been on the advisory board of Verily. She is a member of the National Academy of Medicine and the Payment Advisory Commission. She served as an external advisory board member of the University of Pennsylvania's Center for Health Incentives & Behavioral Economics (CHIBE) from 2016-2023.

Political offices
Preceded by Howard Koh	United States Assistant Secretary of Health and Human Services for Health; 2014–2017	Succeeded by Don J. Wright; Acting
