= EHealth Exchange =

Health information exchange network in the U.S.

eHealth Exchange
- Founded: 2006 (as independent nonprofit)
- Type: 501(c)(3) nonprofit organization
- Headquarters: Vienna, Virginia, U.S.
- Key people: Doug Dietzman (president)
- Website: ehealthexchange.org

eHealth Exchange is a U.S. health information exchange network that enables electronic sharing of health information among participating organizations.

In 2023, eHealth Exchange was designated as one of the first Qualified Health Information Network™ (QHIN™) under the Trusted Exchange Framework and Common Agreement™ (TEFCA™), a nationwide interoperability framework overseen by the Office of the National Coordinator for Health Information Technology (ONC).

ehealth Exchange was the first Health Information Exchange (HIN) network established in the United States. According to the company, it is the largest public/private health information network with an annual impact of over 32 billion data exchanges across over 63,000 participating nodes.

== History ==
The eHealth Exchange network traces its roots to the Nationwide Health Information Network (NHIN/NwHIN), a U.S. Department of Health and Human Services initiative associated with ONC to support interoperable health information exchange.

The impetus of the eHealth Exchange was federal efforts to develop a foundation for interoperable data exchange across the United States. The organization was founded as the Nationwide Health Information Network (NwHIN) by the U.S. Office of the National Coordinator for Health Information Technology (ONC) ^{[1]}. In 2009, its first data exchange connected the Social Security Administration and MedVirginia, and within two years, the network had grown to 23 participants including five federal agencies.

In 2012, the Office of the National Coordinator for Health Information Technology (ONC) transferred stewardship of the NwHIN to the private sector The Sequoia Project. The Sequoia Project soon renamed the network to eHealth Exchange with the published mission: "eHealth Exchange provides trusted, standardized secure and seamless data exchange to improve patient care outcomes, reduce costs, reduce administrative burden, and improve public health capabilities."

In 2018, eHealth Exchange was established as an independent nonprofit organization. According to the company, it has become one of the first designated QHINs to serve as a hub under ONC’s TEFCA.'

== See also ==
- Health information technology
- Electronic health records in the United States
