= Electronic Prescriptions for Controlled Substances =

U.S. regulation for electronic prescribing of controlled substances

United States (delegated rulemaking)
- Long title: Interim final rule (with request for comment) revising DEA regulations to allow practitioners to issue, and pharmacies to receive, dispense, and archive, electronic prescriptions for controlled substances.
- Citation: 75 FR 16236 (Mar. 31, 2010)
- Territorial extent: United States
- Enacted by: Drug Enforcement Administration (U.S. Department of Justice)
- Enacted: March 31, 2010
- Effective: June 1, 2010
- Authorizing legislation: Controlled Substances Act (21 U.S.C. § 801–971)
- Administered by: Drug Enforcement Administration

Amended by
- Transfer of Electronic Prescriptions for Schedules II–V Controlled Substances Between Pharmacies for Initial Filling, 88 FR 48365 (effective Aug. 28, 2023)

Text of statute as originally enacted

Revised text of statute as amended
- Status: In force

Electronic Prescriptions for Controlled Substances (EPCS) was originally a proposal for the DEA to revise its regulations to provide practitioners with the option of writing electronic prescriptions for controlled substances. These regulations would also permit pharmacies to receive, dispense, and archive these electronic prescriptions. These proposed regulations would be an addition to, not a replacement of, the existing rule.

In 2010, DEA regulations were modified which lifted previous restrictions against the use of electronic prescribing for controlled substances that have presented a major obstacle to e-prescribing proliferation. As healthcare providers move to implement these new regulations, e-prescribing can be expected to reduce paperwork for pharmacies and practitioners, reduce prescription forgery and help integrate prescription records in electronic medical records.

== Background ==
The rule “Electronic Prescriptions for Controlled Substances” (75 FR 16236, March 31, 2010) [Docket No. DEA-218, RIN 1117-AA61] provides practitioners with the option of writing and transmitting prescriptions for controlled substances electronically. The regulations also permit pharmacies to receive, dispense, and archive these electronic prescriptions. The rule became effective on June 1, 2010.

== History ==
=== The mandate ===
In 1970, the DEA implemented the Comprehensive Drug Abuse Prevention and Control Act of 1970, also known as the Controlled Substances Act (CSA) (21 U.S.C. 801–971). At this time, most transactions, and particularly prescriptions were done on paper.

These regulations ensure an adequate supply of controlled substances for legitimate medical, scientific, research, and industrial purposes. The regulations also deter the diversion of controlled substances to illegal purposes. The CSA mandates that DEA establish a closed system of control for manufacturing, distributing, and dispensing controlled substances. Part of CSA mandate included that some records must be created and kept on forms that DEA provides and that many controlled substance prescriptions must be manually signed.

=== DEA examines revision ===
In 1999, in response to requests from the regulated community, the Drug Enforcement Administration (DEA) began to examine how to revise its regulations to allow the use of electronic systems within the limits imposed by the existing statutes, while being mindful that the records had to be usable in legal actions. On April 1, 2005, after extensive consultation with the regulated community, DEA published a final rule that allowed the electronic creation, signature, transmission, and retention of records of orders for Schedule I and Schedule II controlled substances, orders that prior to that time had to be created on preprinted forms that DEA issued.

At the same time, DEA began to examine how to revise its rules to allow electronic prescriptions for controlled substances. The DEA had to mindful that regulations on electronic prescriptions must be consistent with other statutory mandates and Federal regulations. Looking back, E-Sign was signed into law on June 30, 2000. It establishes the basic rules for using electronic signatures and records in commerce, and it electronic commerce by giving legal effect to electronic signatures and records and protecting consumers.

=== Electronic prescriptions ===
In 2003, the Medicare Prescription Drug, Improvement, and Modernization Act was implemented. It contained a requirement pertaining to electronic transmission of prescriptions and prescription-related information for its Medicare program. One of the considerations in support of this move to electronic prescriptions was the view that using electronic prescriptions in lieu of written or oral prescriptions could reduce medical errors that occur because handwriting is illegible or phoned-in prescriptions are misunderstood as a result of similar-sounding medication names. Another consideration is that, if prescription records are linked to other medical records, practitioners can be alerted at the time of prescribing to possible interactions with other drugs the patient is taking or allergies a patient might have. Electronic prescribing systems can also link to insurance formulary lists to inform the practitioner prior to prescribing whether a drug is covered by a patient's insurance.

The Secretary of the Department of Health and Human Services (HHS) adopted a rule on the transmission standard for electronic prescriptions in November 2005 (revised in June 2006). The standard focuses on the format of the transmitted information, not the process of creating the prescription or maintaining the record at the pharmacy. The standard specifies fields (name, date, address, etc.) and field lengths for certain transactions including issuing new prescriptions and refills. However, there is no requirement that practitioners or pharmacies use electronic prescriptions. It does require that companies that sponsor Medicare prescription drug coverage establish and maintain an electronic prescription program that meets the standard.

=== A distinct scope ===
The rule has been written to be consistent with the above delineated HHS standard. However, the context in which the HHS standard was issued was not specific to controlled substances and therefore not designed to provide safeguards against the diversion of controlled substances. The responsibility for establishing regulatory safeguards against diversion of controlled substances falls upon DEA as the agency charged with administering and enforcing the CSA. Accordingly, while the DEA's rule is designed to work in tandem with the HHS standard, its scope is necessarily distinct from the HHS standard.

=== Approved certification process ===
DEA amended its regulations to specify the conditions under which controlled substance prescriptions may be issued electronically. Before any electronic prescription or pharmacy application may be used to transmit prescriptions, a third party must audit the application for compliance, or a certifying organization whose certification process has been approved by DEA must verify and certify that the application meets requirements. The following list provides the names and contact information of certifying organizations whose certification processes have been approved by DEA.https://www.deadiversion.usdoj.gov/ecomm/thirdparty.html

- Drummond Group, LLC
- iBeta LLC
- DirectTrust.org, Inc.
- UL, LLC (Formally InfoGard Laboratories, Inc.) - while still listed on the DEA website, UL announced to its customers in August 2025 that it will be winding down its EPCS services.

== Impact on physicians and pharmacies ==
Before issuing electronic prescriptions for controlled substances, practitioners must meet several key requirements. One, they must use a software application that conforms to regulatory standards. They must also be credentialed for two-factor authentication, utilizing two of the following potential identification factors: (1) password or response to a question whose answer is known only to the practitioner (2) unique physical information, such as fingerprint or iris scan, otherwise known as biometric data or (3) physical object such as cryptographic key or hard token. Specific security measures must also be implemented. These include the requirement that two people need to authorize each controlled-drug e-prescription. One person confirms that the practitioner is authorized to sign the prescription. The second person is the practitioner who confirms his identity using the two-factor authentication system described above.

Every provider's workflow is likely to be somewhat different. One potential workflow for renewal requests would proceed as follows. The patient calls the pharmacy to request renewal. The pharmacy sends the electronic renewal request to the prescriber's office. The prescriber reviews and authorizes. The response is then sent electronically to the pharmacy. Staff involvement in generating prescriptions for the prescriber to sign varies by practice. The new method of dispensing allows pharmacists to submit an accurate electronic request for a renewal, decreasing the burden of phone calls on medical office staff. No major changes are expected in the new prescription workflow since the prescriber is the primary actor in the current best practice and is expected to remain so after electronic prescriptions for controlled substances are implemented.

In April 2011 the American Medical Association and four partner organizations issued an updated version of "A Clinician's Guide to Electronic Prescribing." The organizations said the guide reflects changes in the health care environment including the DEA's rule allowing electronic prescribing of controlled substances.

Some state laws and regulations will require changes before controlled substance e-prescribing becomes fully legal. State boards of pharmacy are offering guidance to licensees regarding DEA e-prescribing software requirements and the legality of controlled substance e-prescribing in their respective states. While the legality of e-prescribing controlled substances will vary from state-to-state for some time to come, e-prescribing as a whole will likely take a firm hold throughout the country and achieve its potential as a universal, efficient, and safer method of helping patients access their medications.

== See also ==
- DEA regulations on Electronic Prescribing of Controlled Substances
