= Office of the National Coordinator for Health Information Technology =

U.S. federal agency

Agency overview
- Formed: April 27, 2004
- Headquarters: Mary E. Switzer Memorial Building Washington, DC
- Agency executives: Micky Tripathi, PhD., National Coordinator for Health IT; Steven Posnack, M.S., M.H.S., Deputy National Coordinator for Health IT
- Parent department: Health and Human Services
- Website: healthit.gov

The Office of the National Coordinator for Health Information Technology (ONC) is a staff division of the Office of the Secretary, within the U.S. Department of Health and Human Services. ONC leads national health IT efforts. It is charged as the principal federal entity to coordinate nationwide efforts to implement the use of advanced health information technology and the electronic exchange of health information.

President George W. Bush created the position of National Coordinator on April 27, 2004 through Executive Order 13335. Congress later mandated ONC in the Health Information Technology for Economic and Clinical Health Act provisions of the American Recovery and Reinvestment Act of 2009, under the Obama Administration.

== Mission ==
With the passage of the HITECH Act, the Office of the National Coordinator for Health Information Technology (ONC) is charged with building an interoperable, private and secure nationwide health information system and supporting the widespread, meaningful use of health information technology.

ONC's mission is looking ahead as it begins its second decade in 2014. ONC is working to improve these five areas:

- Adoption: increase end user adoption of electronic health records and health IT to capture and use the information
- Standards: establish standards so the various technologies can speak to each other
- Incentives: provide the right incentives for the market to drive financial and clinical advances
- Privacy and security: make sure protected (personal) health information remains private and secure
- Governance: provide governance and structure for the exchange of health information

The concerted initiative on interoperability in 2014 seeks to achieve the ability of two or more systems to exchange health information and use the information once it is received.

The mission of ONC is to optimize the paths to reach these five health IT goals along with interoperability to support the Triple Aim.

Widely adopted by the healthcare sector, the Triple Aim was developed by the Institute for Healthcare Improvement to 1) improve patient experience of care, 2) improve the health of populations, and 3) reduce per capita costs of healthcare.

The Federal Health IT Strategic Plan from 2011-2015 had set these five goals

- Achieve adoption and information exchange through meaningful use of health IT
- Improve care, improve population health, and reduce healthcare costs through the use of health IT
- Inspire confidence and trust in health IT
- Empower individuals with health IT to improve their health and the health care system
- Achieve rapid learning and technological advancement

In its ongoing work, ONC is looking to address these priorities in 2014:

- Evolve from ARRA structure of the ONC
- Federal HIT Strategic Plan
- Develop national consensus agenda
- Health information exchange, use and infrastructure a priority focus
- Meaningful use
- Advance health IT tools in support of the Triple Aim

ONC's mission had previously been described as

- Promoting development of a nationwide HIT infrastructure that allows for electronic use and exchange of information that:
  - Ensures secure and protected patient health information
  - Improves health care quality
  - Reduces health care costs
  - Informs medical decisions at the time/place of care
  - Includes meaningful public input in infrastructure development
  - Improves coordination of care and information among hospitals, labs, physicians, etc.
  - Improves public health activities and facilitates early identification/rapid response to public health emergencies
  - Facilitates health and clinical research
  - Promotes early detection, prevention, and management of chronic diseases
  - Promotes a more effective marketplace
  - Improves efforts to reduce health disparities
- Providing leadership in the development, recognition, and implementation of standards and the certification of HIT products;
- Health IT policy coordination;
- Strategic planning for HIT adoption and health information exchange; and
- Establishing governance for the Nationwide Health Information Network.

== Leadership ==
The structure of the agency offers insight into its strategic goals, and the agency's continued interest in collaborative, transparent, experienced leadership.

=== National Coordinators ===
Thomas Keane, MD (June 2025 – present)
Micky Tripathi PhD. (January 20, 2021 – January 20, 2025)
Don Rucker, MD (April 2017 – January 2021)
Jon White, MD (interim, January 2017 – April 2017)
White briefly served as acting National Coordinator prior to the appointment of Donald Rucker.
Vindell Washington (12 August 2016 – 19 January 2017)
Washington previously served as Principal Deputy National Coordinator.
Karen DeSalvo (13 January 2014 – 12 August 2016)
DeSalvo became National Coordinator for Health Information Technology on January 13, 2014, after serving as Health Commissioner for the City of New Orleans and Senior Health Policy Advisor to New Orleans Mayor Mitchell Landrieu. The role of National Coordinator is responsible for developing and executing the nation's Health Information Technology agenda. In New Orleans Dr. DeSalvo modernized and improved the effectiveness of the health department, and restored health care to devastated areas of the city, including leading the establishment of a public hospital. Prior to joining the Mayor's administration, DeSalvo was a professor of medicine and vice dean for community affairs and health policy at Tulane University School of Medicine. DeSalvo left ONC on August 12, 2016 to focus on her work as Acting Assistant Secretary of Health.
Jacob Reider (interim, 4 October 2013 – 13 January 2014)
Reider took the role of Acting National Coordinator for Health IT when Farzad Mostishari left ONC to become a visiting fellow at the Brookings Institution on October 4, 2013. He served as ONC's Deputy National Coordinator when Karen DeSalvo became National Coordinator.
Farzad Mostashari (2011 – 4 October 2013)
As National Coordinator Mostishari led ONC's major implementation phase after first joining ONC as its deputy national coordinator in July 2009. As deputy he developed a series of grant programs to promote electronic health record adoption, furthered the development of health information exchange, and helped construct the workforce development program. His vision has been instrumental in the formulation of the ONC’s Health IT Strategic Plan, the creation of ONC’s Authorized Testing and Certification Bodies, and influenced future stages of Meaningful Use.
David Blumenthal (20 April 2009 – 2011)
Physician and Harvard Medical School Professor David Blumenthal was appointed National Coordinator on March 20, 2009 and assumed the position on 20 April 2009. He set the inaugural tone and led the accelerated ramp up and development of the vastly expanded and fully funded role of ONC with the development of the many programs authorized by the HITECH Act, with the cooperation of the Centers for Medicare and Medicaid Services.
Robert Kolodner (interim, 18 September 2006; permanent, 18 April 2007 – 20 April 2009)
Psychiatrist Robert Kolodner became Acting National Coordinator on September 18, 2006, and was formally appointed as National Coordinator of Health Information Technology on April 18, 2007. He retired from the federal government on September 23, 2009.
Karen Bell (interim, April 2006 – 18 September 2006)
Bell briefly served as Acting National Coordinator between Brailer's departure in April 2006 and Kolodner's appointment later that year.
David Brailer (2004 – April 2006)
The first National Coordinator of Health Information Technology, physician and venture capitalist, David Brailer, laid critical groundwork for a vision of the role extensive use of electronic health records could play in the modernization of clinical paperwork and digitization of healthcare. Brailer resigned from the position on April 20, 2006.

== Programs ==
The Health Information Technology for Economic and Clinical Health (HITECH) Act seeks to improve American health care delivery and patient care through an unprecedented investment in health information technology. The provisions of the HITECH Act are specifically designed to work together to provide the necessary assistance and technical support to providers, enable coordination and alignment within and among states, establish connectivity to the public health community in case of emergencies, and assure the workforce is properly trained and equipped to be meaningful users of Electronic Health Records (EHRs).

EHR Incentive Program Payments and Meaningful Use

The HITECH Act set meaningful use of interoperable EHR adoption in the health care system as a critical national goal and incentivized EHR adoption. The "goal is not adoption alone but 'meaningful use' of EHRs — that is, their use by providers to achieve significant improvements in care." The Centers for Medicare and Medicaid (CMS) managed and distributed these federal funds for the meaningful use of electronic health records in conjunction with state Medicaid departments with the cooperation and support of ONC and ONC programs.

As of March 2014, more than $22.5 billion in combined Medicare and Medicaid EHR Incentive Program payments have been made since 2011. More than $14.8 billion in Medicare EHR Incentive Program payments have been made between May 2011 and March 2014. More than $7.7 billion in Medicaid EHR Incentive Program payments have been made between January 2011 (when the first set of states launched their programs) and March 2014. More than 470,000 eligible professionals, eligible hospitals, and critical access hospitals are actively registered in the Medicare and Medicaid EHR Incentive Programs as of March 2014. According to Modern Healthcare, payments have been made to 90.4% of the 5,011 estimated eligible hospitals; and 69.6% of the estimated 527,200 eligible professionals.

ONC Programs

The following ONC programs help to build the foundation for every American to benefit from an electronic health record, as part of a modernized, interconnected, and vastly improved system of care delivery. Note: The list of programs below is in the process of being revised and updated.

- Health Information Technology Extension Program: A grant program to establish Health Information Technology Regional Extension Centers (RECs) to offer technical assistance, guidance and information on best practices to support and accelerate health care providers’ efforts to become meaningful users of Electronic Health Records (EHRs). While RECs are no longer technically funded by ONC, many of these former grantees have no-cost extensions which allows them to spend whatever is left in their respective grants, as well as find ways to continue their work. The REC program goals were to enroll 100,000 Primary Care Providers (PCPs) in the REC program, help them go "live" on EHRs, and help them demonstrate Meaningful Use. As of January 2014, 136,303 PCPs were enrolled, 123,770 went "live," and 85,106 had demonstrated Meaningful Use. RECs were also encouraged to reach out to all providers, not only PCPs. Among all providers, 149,315 enrolled with RECs, 132,989 went "live" on EHRs, and 89,299 demonstrated Meaningful Use. ONC continues to partner with these former grantees.
- State Health Information Exchange Cooperative Agreement Program: A grant program to support States or State Designated Entities (SDEs) in establishing health information exchange (HIE) capability among healthcare providers and hospitals in their jurisdictions. This program was initially envisioned to support query-based health information exchange programs in each state and territory (56 entities in all). The program transitioned into a mixture of query-based and directed exchange programs in order to support the implementation of Meaningful Use. Meaningful Use required healthcare professionals and hospitals to share authorized health information with each other as well as to send receive lab and prescription information with test labs and pharmacies respectively. ONC also issued challenge grants to those participating in the program to encourage breakthrough innovations for health information exchange that could be leveraged widely to support nationwide health information exchange and interoperability. The challenge grants sought to develop innovative and scalable solutions in five key areas: 1) achieving health goals through health information exchange, 2) improving long-term and post-acute care transitions, 3) consumer-mediated information exchange, 4) enabling enhanced query for patient care, and 5) fostering distributed population-level analytics. As of Quarter 3 of 2013, 44 states/territories had directed exchange broadly available, with another 6 reporting regional or piloted programs. As of Quarter 3 of 2013, 32 states/territories had operational query-based exchange broadly available statewide through single or multiple services/entities, 8 had query-based exchange broadly available in regions but not statewide, and 16 did not have operational query-based exchange options available. ONC is continuing to partner with these state entities.
- Strategic Health IT Advanced Research Projects (SHARP) Program: A grant program to fund research focused on achieving breakthrough advances to address well-documented problems that have impeded adoption:
  - Security of Health Information Technology
  - Patient-Centered Cognitive Support
  - Healthcare Application and Network Platform Architectures
  - Secondary Use of EHR Data
- Beacon Community Program: A grant program for communities to build and strengthen their health information technology (health IT) infrastructure and exchange capabilities. These communities will demonstrate the vision of a future where hospitals, clinicians, and patients are meaningful users of health IT, and together the community achieves measurable improvements in health care quality, safety, efficiency, and population health. According to a March 2013 Evaluation, "The Beacon Communities have implemented a wide variety of interventions, including innovations in care delivery, provider feedback and performance measurement initiatives, health IT development projects, and tools to improve the process of care for providers and consumers. Each Beacon Community has tailored its activities to reflect its unique resources, goals, and populations, resulting in a broad range of activities. In many cases, the Communities have chosen to focus all or some of their efforts on specific disease categories." While Beacon programs are no longer technically funded by ONC, many of these former grantees have no-cost extensions which allows them to spend whatever is left in their respective grants, as well as find ways to continue their work. ONC continues to partner with these former grantees.
- Health IT Workforce Training Programs
- Community College Consortia to Educate Health Information Technology Professionals Program: A grant program that seeks to rapidly create health IT education and training programs at Community Colleges or expand existing programs. Community Colleges funded under this initiative will establish intensive, non-degree training programs that can be completed in six months or less. This is one component of the Health IT Workforce Program.
- Program of Assistance for University-Based Training: A grant program to rapidly increase the availability of individuals qualified to serve in specific health information technology professional roles requiring university-level training. This is one component of the Health IT Workforce Program.

*Combined Results of Community College and University-Based Training: In total the two programs trained 21,437 students from all 50 states, the District of Columbia, Puerto Rico, and the U.S. Virgin Islands at 91 academic institutions.

- Curriculum Development Centers Program: A grant program to provide $10 million in grants to institutions of higher education (or consortia thereof) to support health information technology (health IT) curriculum development. This is one component of the Health IT Workforce Program.
- Competency Examination for Individuals Completing Non-Degree Training Program: A grant program to provide $6 million in grants to an institution of higher education (or consortia thereof) to support the development and initial administration of a set of health IT competency examinations. This is one component of the Health IT Workforce Program.
- Current Certification Bodies include Drummond Group, LLC. and SLI Compliance. Recently, the Certification Body Leidos announced they are leaving the ONC Health IT program. As of February 3, 2026 Drummond Group is listed as the ACB for 506 certified products on the ONC CHPL website list of certified products. SLI Compliance is listed as the ACB for 156 certified products. Leidos is shown as the ACB for 23 certified products.

== Advisory committees ==
In January 2018, the Health Information Technology Advisory Committee (HITAC) was established as required under the 21st Century Cures Act.

Health Information Technology Advisory Committee (HITAC) | HealthIT.gov

Term: 2021-current

Co-Chair: Aaron Miri

Co-Chair: Denise Webb

Term: 2018-2020

Co-Chair: Robert Wah

Co-Chair: Carolyn Peterson

ONC also created two Federal Advisory Committees (FACAs), the Health IT Policy Committee, which the National Coordinator chairs, and the Health IT Standards Committee. Both of these committees were disbanded in 2018 due to new legal requirements within the 21st century cures act.

Health IT Policy Committee

The Health IT Policy Committee recommends a policy framework for the development and adoption of a nationwide health information technology infrastructure that permits the electronic exchange and use of health information. Vice-chair of this committee is Paul Tang, MD, MS, who is Vice President, Chief Innovation and Technology Officer at Palo Alto Medical Foundation.

Health IT Standards Committee

The Health IT Standards Committee recommends to the National Coordinator standards, implementation specifications, and certification criteria. The Standards Committee also harmonizes, pilot tests, and ensures consistency with the Social Security Act. Vice-chair of this committee is John Halamka, MD, MS, who is Chief Information Officer of Beth Israel Deaconess Medical Center, Professor at Harvard Medical School, and a practicing Emergency Physician.
