= Caché ObjectScript =

Programming language

- First appeared: 1997
- OS: Cross-platform

Influenced by
- MUMPS

Caché ObjectScript is a part of the Caché database system sold by InterSystems. The language is a functional superset of the ANSI-standard MUMPS programming language. Since Caché is at its core a MUMPS implementation, it can run ANSI MUMPS routines with no change. To appeal as a commercial product, Caché implements support for object-oriented programming, a macro preprocessing language, embedded SQL for ANSI-standard SQL access to M's built-in database, procedure and control blocks using C-like brace syntax, procedure-scoped variables, and relaxed whitespace syntax limitations.

The language has private and public variables and globals. Global has a different meaning in this language than in most; such variables are global across routines, processes, and sessions. Thus, editing a global variable is making permanent and immediate changes to a system-universal database (which survives reboots, etc.). The scope of a private variable is the local function, the scope of a public variable is the entire process. Variables, private and public, may be single elements or complete multi-dimensional arrays.

The great majority of Caché's feature-set is inherited from the ANSI MUMPS standard. See that article for details on how data is represented and the different ways a programmer can think about the data during development.

== Caché programming examples ==
=== Hello world program as a routine ===
hello // hello world routine
    write "hello world"
end quit  // end

Then in Caché Terminal (assuming you wrote the hello routine to the SAMPLE namespace):

SAMPLE> DO ^hello

=== Hello world program as a ClassMethod ===
Class User.Helloworld
{
  ClassMethod HelloWorld()
  {
    // Write to console
    Write "Hello World"
    Quit
  }
}

Then in Caché Terminal (assuming you wrote the User.Helloworld Class to the SAMPLE namespace):

SAMPLE> DO ##class(User.Helloworld).HelloWorld()

== See also ==
- GT.M, an implementation of MUMPS
- Profile Scripting Language, an extension to MUMPS
