= VistA Web =

VistAWeb is a portal accessible through CPRS (Computerized Patient Recordkeeping System), the graphical user interface for the Veterans Health Information Systems and Technology Architecture (VistA), the electronic health record used throughout the United States Department of Veterans Affairs (VA) medical system (known as the Veterans Health Administration (VHA)).

VistAWeb is a product of the VA Medical Center at Ann Arbor, MI.

This portal has been implemented throughout the VA system, allowing healthcare providers at any VA facility to view records from all the sites the patient has been seen at.

As originally created, the VA health systems has 21 regional data systems (VISN) each with a number of medical centers totaling around 125 centers. Every center has the same hierarchical database (VistA) though each, serving different patients, has different data. The usage of VistA throughout the VA has helped to standardize records, but there has until recently not been an easy way for accessing records from other medical centers.

Not all medical centers provide all the same services and patients are routinely referred from smaller centers to larger ones for special procedures. Further, patients often travel to other locations in the country and then visit VA facilities far from their home. VistAWeb affords any healthcare provider access to the records at all these centers, be they remote or local.

== Introduction ==
VistAWeb is an intranet web application used to review remote patient information found in VistA, the Federal Health Information Exchange (FHIE) system, i.e., the Department of Defense, and Indian Health Services. To a large extent, VistAWeb mirrors the reports behavior of the Computerized Patient Record System (CPRS) and Remote Data View (RDV). However, by permitting a more robust and timely retrieval of remote-site patient data, VistAWeb is also an enhancement to CPRS/RDV.

There are three ways to access VistAWeb. It can be made available by adding it to the CPRS Tools Menu, and it can be selected as the default method of retrieving data from the Remote Data Available button in CPRS. These two methods are referred to as CPRS-spawned versions of VistAWeb. They are compliant with the Health Level 7 (HL7) Clinical Context Object Workgroup (CCOW) standards and therefore maintain context with the patient selected in CPRS. As a third option, VistAWeb can be accessed in a standalone mode from its website at https://vistaweb.med.va.gov/.

The standalone version of VistAWeb is connected to neither CPRS nor the clinical context management application. Standalone VistAWeb serves an important function for users who have been granted special access to multiple sites, such as for National Programs, Veterans Administration (VA) researchers, and others.

== Usage for record access following natural disaster ==
VistAWeb was also made available broadly, though temporarily, to assist clinical staff with the retrieval of patient information from the sites affected by damage caused by Hurricane Katrina.

== Usage for record access from DoD ==
VistAWeb was also expanded for to access patient records from the DoD AHLTA patient record system in 2009. This relied on mapping data from AHLTA via a bidirectional data exchange system to VistA. Due to errors in the bidirectional exchange system, erroneous data was transmitted to the VA, causing this remote viewer function from DoD sites to be closed.

== Availability ==
The VistAWeb package is distributed in the public domain as a module of the VistA software package under the Freedom of Information Act (FOIA). It is therefore available from the VA FTP site, from the VA software distribution office, and in bundled packages. Its capabilities, therefore, can be achieved by a healthcare institution that installs the VistA electronic health record.

== See also ==
- Electronic health record
- Health informatics
- MUMPS
- Veterans Health Administration
- United States Department of Veterans Affairs
