= LSS =

LSS may refer to:

== Companies and organizations ==
=== Companies ===
- LSS Data Systems, a medical software company
- Lone Star Steel Company, a tubular steel mill in Lone Star, Texas

=== Schools ===
- Lakeland School System, school district in Lakeland, Tennessee
- Laurel Springs School, Ojai, California, United States
- Lawrence Sheriff School, Rugby, Warwickshire
- Langstaff Secondary School, Richmond Hill, Ontario

=== Other organizations ===
- Law Society of Saskatchewan
- Leicester Secular Society, the world's oldest Secular Society
- Life Saving Society
- Lithic Studies Society
- Lincoln Square Synagogue, Manhattan, New York City
- Lunds Studentsångförening, a Swedish male-voice choir

== Science and technology ==
- Large-scale structure of the universe
- Large Space Simulator, Space simulator
- Life Span Study of atomic bomb survivors, see Epidemiology data for low-linear energy transfer radiation
- LSS (gene), an enzyme
- LSS (Lynxmotion Smart Servo), a series of hobbyist-grade smart actuators created by RobotShop Inc.
- Landing Ship Stern Chute, a converted train ferry used early in WW2 as Dock landing ship
- Lumbar spinal stenosis, a medical condition in which the spinal canal narrows
- XM26 Lightweight Shotgun System

== Other uses ==
- L. S. Sheshagiri Rao, Indian writer and scholar of Kannada literature
- Lean Six Sigma, a synergized managerial concept of Lean manufacturing and Six Sigma
- Licentiate of Sacred Scripture, see Licentiate of Sacred Theology
- Logistics Support System
- Lone Star Showdown, the official rivalry between the Texas A&M Aggies and the Texas Longhorns
- LSS (Last Song Syndrome), a 2019 Philippine film
