= Phillip Ragon =

American entrepreneur and philanthropist

Phillip T. Ragon
- Born: Phillip Terrence Ragon; June 1, 1949 (age 77); Arizona.U.S
- Education: Massachusetts Institute of Technology (B.S. in Physics)
- Alma mater: MIT
- Occupations: Businessman, Philanthropist
- Known for: Founder & CEO of InterSystems
- Board member of: Harvard Medical School Board of Fellows MIT Corporation MIT Jameel Clinic Advisory Board
- Spouse: Susan Ragon
- Children: 2
- Awards: Golden Plate Award

Phillip Terrence "Terry" Ragon (born June 1, 1949) is an American entrepreneur and philanthropist who founded InterSystems and is the current CEO.

== Early life and education ==
The son of a U.S. Air Force fighter pilot, Ragon was born in Arizona. He grew up in a variety of states and graduated from high school in Bogotá, Colombia. He graduated from MIT in 1971 with a B.S. in physics.

== Career ==
In 1978, Phillip Ragon founded InterSystems Corporation in Cambridge, Massachusetts, to develop and sell database management and healthcare information systems. He is currently the CEO and owner.

The company initially developed MUMPS-based systems, releasing ISM-11 for the DEC PDP-11. Over time, InterSystems acquired several MUMPS implementations, including DTM from Data Tree in 1993, DSM from Digital in 1995, and MSM from Micronetics in 1998, consolidating these technologies into its Caché database released in 1997. Subsequent products include Ensemble (2003), HealthShare (2006), and InterSystems IRIS Data Platform (2017), which integrates database management, interoperability, and analytics capabilities.

InterSystems has expanded globally, establishing over 35 offices worldwide and serving clients in more than 80 countries. The company's software solutions are utilized across various industries, including healthcare, finance, and logistics. Notably, the U.S. Department of Veterans Affairs employs InterSystems IRIS to manage over 3 petabytes of data.

Ragon is a member of the Harvard Medical School Board of Fellows, and a member of MIT Corporation (the governing body of MIT), and a member of the advisory board of the MIT Jameel Clinic.

In 2025, with a net worth of $3.4 billion, Forbes ranked Ragon No. 378 on the Forbes 400 list of the richest people in America.

=== Philanthropy ===
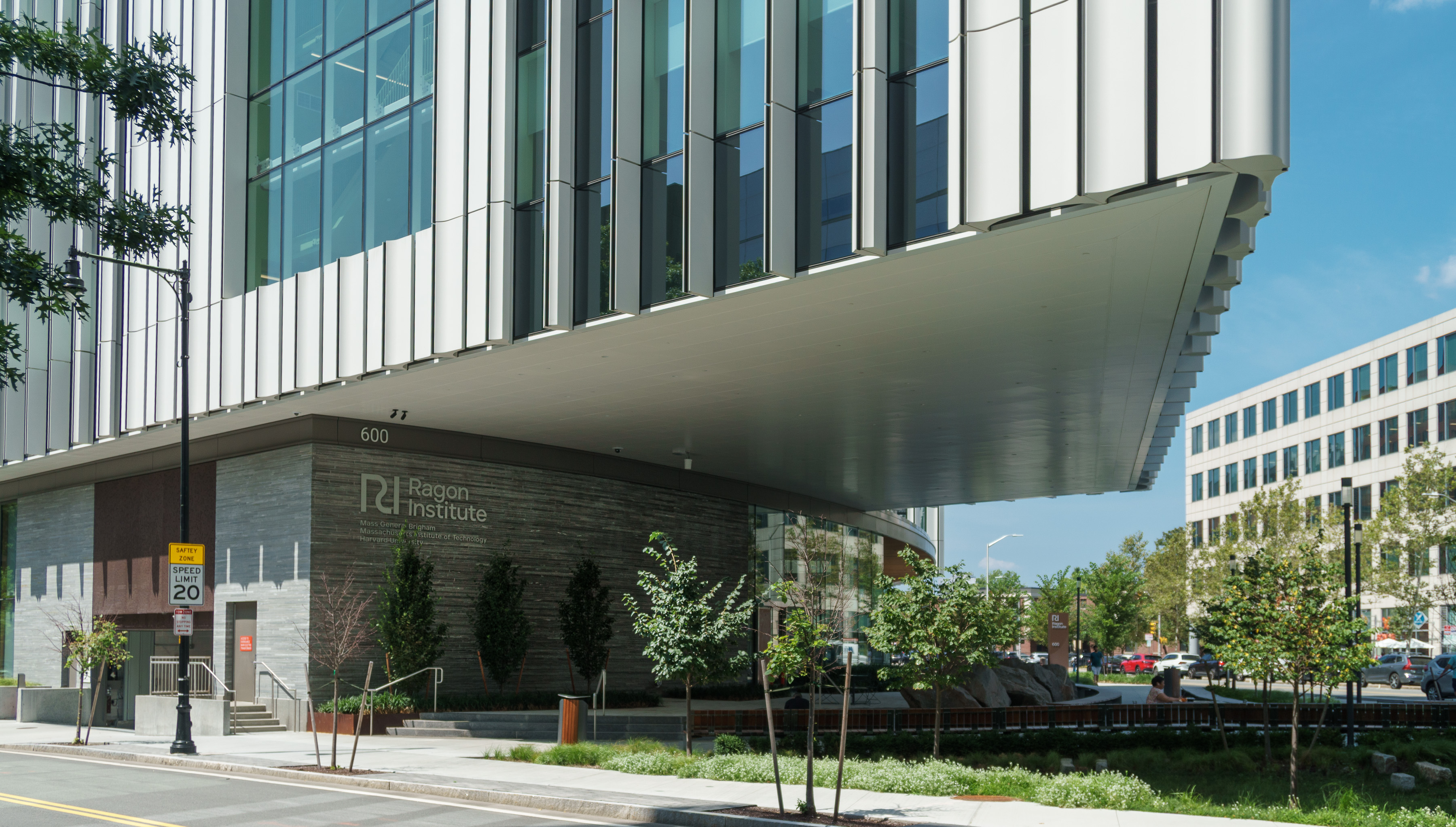
The Ragon Institute in Cambridge, Massachusetts

In March 2017, Ragon, and wife Susan, signed The Giving Pledge, vowing to donate at least half of their money to philanthropic causes.

In 2009, Ragon pledged to donate US $100 million over 10 years period for AIDS research through the Phillip T. and Susan M. Ragon Institute at the Massachusetts General Hospital (MGH) after witnessing the plight of the disease in South Africa. The Ragons donated $200 million to MGH in 2019, the largest donation in the hospital's history.

In April 2019, Ragon and his wife announced that they were donating a further $200 million to Massachusetts General Hospital for a vaccine-research center.

== Personal life ==
Ragon is married to Susan M. Ragon, and they have two children. The couple resides in Massachusetts and actively supports various charitable initiatives

== Awards and honors ==
In 2022, Ragon received the Golden Plate Award of the American Academy of Achievement.
