= VistA =

Health information system

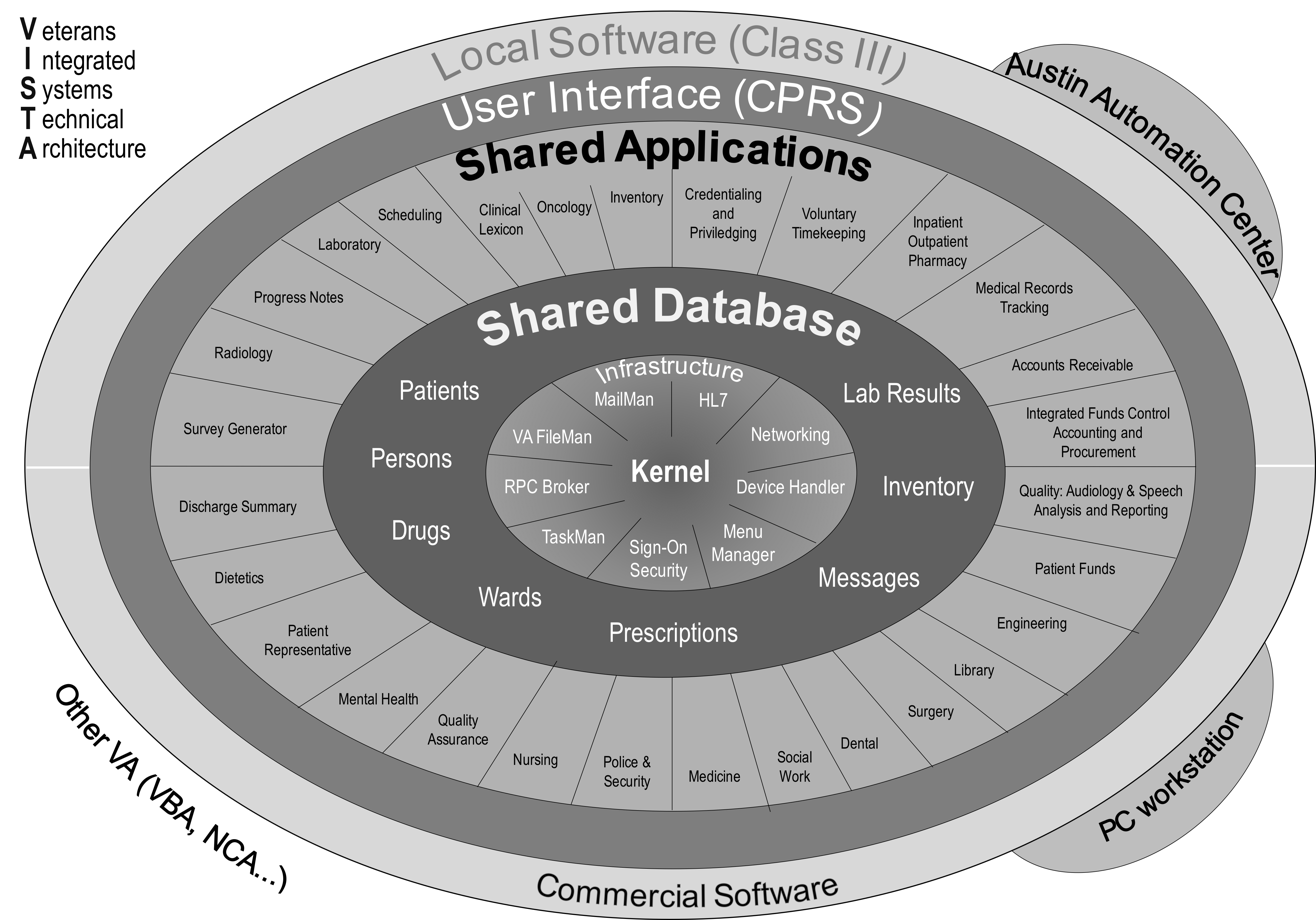
VistA's Architecture is an "Onion" with concentric layers of functions. At its core is a single shared database that all applications use.

The Veterans Health Information Systems and Technology Architecture (VistA) is the system of record for the clinical, administrative and financial operations of the Veterans Health Administration VistA consists of over 180 clinical, financial, and administrative applications integrated within a single shared lifelong database (figure 1).

The Veterans Health Administration (VHA) is the largest integrated national healthcare delivery system in the United States, providing care for nearly 9 million veterans by 180,000 medical professionals.

VistA received the Computerworld Smithsonian Award for best use of Information Technology in Medicine, and more recently received the highest overall satisfaction rating by physician users of EHRs in the U.S.

In May, 2018, the VA awarded a contract to modernize VistA by implementing a commercial EHR. The projected completion for implementing the commercial EHR was by 2028. By March 2023 – halfway through the program – only 5 the total of 150 VA medical centers (3%) had piloted the new system. Numerous reports of safety and reliability had emerged at the commercial EHR sites, and four veterans had suffered premature death. As a result, in April 2023 the House Veterans Affairs Committee for Health IT issued a bill to terminate the commercial EHR contract

== Clinical Functions ==
- Admission Discharge Transfer (ADT)
- Ambulatory Care Reporting
- Anticoagulation Management Tool (AMT)
- Automated Service Connected Designation (ASCD)
- Beneficiary Travel
- Blind Rehabilitation
- Care Management
- Clinical Case Registries
- Clinical Procedures
- Clinical/Health Data Repository (CHDR)
- Computerized Patient Record System (CPRS)
- CPRS: Adverse Reaction Tracking (ART)
- CPRS: Authorization Subscription Utility (ASU)
- CPRS: Clinical Reminders
- CPRS: Consult/Request Tracking
- CPRS: Health Summary
- CPRS: Problem List
- CPRS: Text Integration Utility (TIU)
- Dentistry
- Electronic Wait List Pharm: National Drug File (NDF)
- Emergency Department Integration Software (EDIS)
- Functional Independence Measurement (FIM)
- Group Notes Primary Care Management Module (PCMM)
- HDR – Historical (HDR-Hx)
- Home Based Primary Care (HBPC)
- Home Telehealth
- Immunology Case Registry (ICR)
- Incomplete Records Tracking (IRT)
- Intake and Output Scheduling
- Laboratory Shift Handoff Tool
- Laboratory: Anatomic Pathology
- Laboratory: Blood Bank
- Laboratory: Blood Bank Workarounds
- Laboratory: Electronic Data Interchange (LEDI)
- Laboratory: Emerging Pathogens Initiative (EPI)
- Laboratory: Howdy Computerized Phlebotomy Login Process
- Laboratory: National Laboratory Tests (NLT) Documents and LOINC Request Form
- Laboratory: Point of Care (POC)
- Laboratory: Universal Interface
- Laboratory: VistA Blood Establishment Computer Software (VBECS)
- Lexicon Utility
- Medicine
- Mental Health (YS)
- Methicillin Resistant Staph Aurerus (MRSA)
- Mobile Electronic Documentation (MED)
- Nationwide Health Information Network Adapter (NHIN)
- Nursing
- Nutrition and Food Service (NFS)
- Oncology
- Patient Appointment Info. Transmission (PAIT)
- Patient Assessment Documentation Package (PADP)
- Patient Care Encounter (PCE)
- Patient Record Flags
- Pharm: Automatic Replenish / Ward Stock (AR/WS)
- Pharm: Bar Code Medication Administration (BCMA)
- Pharm: Benefits Management (PBM)
- Pharm: Consolidated Mail Outpatient Pharmacy
- Pharm: Controlled Substances
- Pharm: Data Management (PDM)
- Pharm: Drug Accountability
- Pharm: Inpatient Medications
- Pharm: Outpatient Pharmacy
- Pharm: Prescription Practices (PPP)
- Prosthetics
- Quality Audiology and Speech Analysis and Reporting (QUASAR)
- Radiology / Nuclear Medicine
- RAI/MDS
- Remote Order Entry System (ROES)
- Social Work
- Spinal Cord Dysfunction
- Standards & Terminology Services (STS)
- Surgery
- Traumatic Brain Injury (TBI)
- Virtual Patient Record
- VistA Imaging System
- VistAWeb
- Visual Impairment Service Team (VIST)
- Vitals / Measurements
- Women's Health

== Financial-Administrative Functions ==
- Accounts Receivable (AR)
- Auto Safety Incident Surv Track System (ASISTS)
- Automated Information Collection System (AICS)
- Automated Medical Information Exchange (AMIE)
- Clinical Monitoring System Integrated Billing (IB)
- Compensation Pension Record Interchange (CAPRI)
- Current Procedural Terminology (CPT) Library
- Decision Support System (DSS) Extracts
- Diagnostic Related Group (DRG) Grouper
- Electronic Claims Management Engine (ECME)
- Engineering (AEMS / MERS) Police and Security
- Enrollment Application System Quality Management Integration Module
- Equipment / Turn-In Request
- Event Capture Release of Information (ROI) Manager
- Fee Basis
- Fugitive Felon Program (FFP)
- Generic Code Sheet (GCS)
- Health Eligibility Center (HEC)
- Hospital Inquiry (HINQ)
- ICD-9-CM
- Incident Reporting
- Income Verification Match (IVM)
- Integrated Patient Funds
- Occurrence Screen
- Patient Representative
- Personnel and Accounting Integrated Data (PAID)
- Record Tracking
- Veterans Identification Card (VIC/PICS)
- Voluntary Service System (VSS)
- WebHR
- Wounded Injured and Ill Warriors

== Infrastructure Functions ==
- Capacity Management Tools
- Duplicate Record Merge: Patient Merge Name Standardization
- Electronic Error and Enhancement Reporting (E3R)
- Enterprise Exception Log Service (EELS)
- FatKAAT
- FileMan
- FileMan Delphi Components (FMDC)
- Health Data Informatics
- Health Level 7 (HL7) (VistA Messaging)
- Institution File Redesign (IFR)
- KAAJEE
- Kernel
- Kernel Delphi Components (KDC)
- Kernel Toolkit
- Kernel Unwinder
- List Manager
- M-to-M Broker
- MailMan
- Master Patient Index (MPI)
- Medical Domain Web Services (MDWS) (MWVS*2)
- National Online Information Sharing (NOIS)
- National Patch Module
- Network Health Exchange (NHE)
- Patient Data Exchange (PDX)
- Remote Procedure Call (RPC) Broker
- Resource Usage Monitor
- Single Signon/User Context (SSO/UC)
- SlotMaster (Kernel ZSLOT)
- SQL Interface (SQLI)
- Standard Files and Tables
- Statistical Analysis of Global Growth (SAGG)
- Survey Generator
- System Toolkit (STK)
- VistA Data Extraction Framework (VDEF)
- VistALink
- XML Parser (VistA)

== Patient Web Portal Functions ==
- Clinical Information Support System (CISS)
- Electronic Signature (ESig) Person Services
- HealtheVet Web Services Client (HWSC) Registries
- My HealtheVet Spinal Cord Injury and Disorders Outcomes (SCIDO)
- National Utilization Management Integration (NUMI)
- Occupational Health Record-keeping System (OHRS)
- Patient Advocate Tracking System (PATS)
- VA Enrollment System (VES)
- Veterans Personal Finance System (VPFS)

== Achievements ==
For its development of VistA, the United States Department of Veterans Affairs (VA) / Veterans Health Administration (VHA) was named the recipient of the Innovations in American Government Award presented by the Ash Institute of the John F. Kennedy School of Government at Harvard University in July, 2006.

The adoption of VistA has allowed the VA to achieve a pharmacy prescription accuracy rate of 99.997%, and the VA outperforms most public sector hospitals on many other quality metrics, all attributable to VistA.

Hospitals using VistA are one of only a few healthcare systems in the U.S. that have achieved the highest level of electronic health record integration HIMSS Stage 7, while a non-VA hospital using VistA is one of only 42 US hospitals that has achieved HIMSS stage 6.

== Licensing and dissemination ==
The VistA system is public domain software, available through the Freedom Of Information Act directly from the VA website or through a growing network of distributors, such as the OSEHRA VistA-M.git tree.

== VistA modules and projects ==
=== Database backend ===
VistA was developed using the M or MUMPS integrated application database. The VA currently runs its VistA systems on a proprietary version of MUMPS called Caché, but an open source MUMPS database engine, called GT.M, for Linux and Unix systems has also been developed.

=== Patient Web Portal ===
MyHealtheVet is a web portal that allows veterans to access and update their personal health record, refill prescriptions, and schedule appointments. This also allows veterans to port their health records to institutions outside the VA health system or keep a personal copy of their health records, a Personal Health Record (PHR).

=== VistA Imaging ===
The Veterans Administration developed VistA Imaging, which is a PACS (radiology imaging) systems and for integrating image-based information, such as X-Rays, CAT-scans, EKGs, pathology slides, and scanned documents into the VistA electronic medical records system. Integration of images into a medical record is critical to efficient high-quality patient care.

== Deployments and uses ==
=== Role in development of a national healthcare network ===
The VistA electronic healthcare record has been widely credited for reforming the VA healthcare system, improving safety and efficiency substantially. The results have spurred a national impetus to adopt electronic medical records similar to VistA nationwide.

A Clinical Data Repository (CDR) /Health Data Repository (HDR) (CHDR) allows interoperability between the DoD's Clinical Data Repository (CDR) & the VA's Health Data Repository (HDR). This is accomplished through the Bidirectional Health Information Exchange (BHIE). Bidirectional real time exchange of pharmacy, allergy, demographic and laboratory data occurred in phase 1. Phase 2 involved additional drug–drug interaction and allergy checking. Initial deployment of the system was completed in March 2007 at the El Paso, Augusta, Pensacola, Puget Sound, Chicago, San Diego, and Las Vegas facilities.

VistA has been interfaced with commercial off-the-shelf products. Standards and protocols used by VA are consistent with current industry standards and include HL7, DICOM, and other protocols.

Tools for CCR/CCD support have been developed for VistA, allowing VistA to communicate with other EHRs using these standardized information exchange protocols. This includes the Mirth open source cross platform HL7 interface and NHIN Connect, the open source health information exchange adaptor.

The VistA EHR has been used by the VA in combination with Telemedicine to provide surgical care to rural areas in Nebraska and Western Iowa over a 400,000-square-mile (1,000,000 km^{2}) area.

=== Usage in non-governmental hospitals ===
Under the Freedom of Information Act (FOIA), the VistA system, the CPRS graphical interface, and unlimited ongoing updates (500–600 per year) are provided as public domain software.

This was done by the U.S. government in an effort to make VistA available as a low cost Electronic Health Record (EHR) for non-governmental hospitals and other healthcare entities.

The VA has produced a version of VistA that runs on GT.M in a Linux operating system, and which was suitable for use in private settings. VistA has since been adapted by companies such as Medsphere to hundreds of hospitals and clinics in the private sector. VistA has been deployed internationally, running the healthcare information system of entire national healthcare systems, such as the Kingdom of Jordan. Some United States universities, such as UC Davis and Texas Tech, have implemented VistA. The non-profit organization, WorldVistA, was established to extend and collaboratively improve the VistA electronic health record and health information system for use outside in the private and public sector throughout the U.S. and internationally.

VistA (and other derivative EMR/EHR systems) can be interfaced with healthcare databases not initially used by the VA system, including billing software, lab databases, and image databases (radiology, for example).

VistA implementations have been deployed (or are currently being deployed) in non-VA healthcare facilities in Texas, Arizona, Florida, Hawaii, New Jersey, Oklahoma, West Virginia, California, New York, and Washington, D.C.

In one state, the cost of a multiple hospital VistA-based EHR network was implemented for one tenth the price of a commercial EHR network in another hospital network in the same state ($9 million versus $90 million for 7–8 hospitals each). (Both VistA and the commercial system used the MUMPS database).

VistA has even been adapted into a Health Information System (VMACS) at the veterinary medical teaching hospital at UC Davis.

=== International deployments ===
VistA software modules have been installed around the world, or are being considered for installation, in healthcare institutions such as the World Health Organization, and in countries such as Mexico, American Samoa, Kurdistan, Iraq, Finland, Jordan, Germany, Kenya, Nigeria, Egypt, Malaysia, India, Brazil, Pakistan, and Denmark.

In September 2009, Dell Computer bought Perot Systems, the company installing VistA in Jordan (the Hakeem project).

== History ==
The name "VistA" (Veterans Health Information Systems and Technology Architecture) was adopted by VA in 1994, when the Under Secretary for Health of the U.S. Department of Veterans Affairs (VA), Dr. Ken Kizer, renamed what was previously called the Decentralized Hospital Computer Program (DHCP).

Both Dr. Robert Kolodner (National Health Information Technology Coordinator) and George Timson (an architect of VistA who has been involved with it since the early years) date VistA's actual architecture genesis, then, to 1977. The program was launched in 1978 with the deployment of the initial modules in about twenty VA Medical Centers. The program was named the Decentralized Hospital Computer Program (DHCP) in 1981.

In December 1981, Congressman Sonny Montgomery of Mississippi arranged for the Decentralized Hospital Computer Program (DHCP) to be written into law as the medical-information systems development program of the VA. VA Administrator Robert P. Nimmo signed an Executive Order in February 1982 describing how the DHCP was to be organized and managed within the VA's Department of Medicine and Surgery.

In conjunction with the VA's DHCP development, the (IHS) Indian Health Service deployed a system built on and augmenting DHCP throughout its Federal and Tribal facilities as the Resource and Patient Management System (RPMS). This implementation emphasized the integration of outpatient clinics into the system, and many of its elements were soon re-incorporated into the VA system (through a system of technology sharing). Subsequent VistA systems therefore included elements from both RPMS and DHCP. Health IT sharing between VA and IHS continues to the present day.

The U.S. Department of Defense (DoD) then contracted with Science Applications International Corporation (SAIC) for a heavily modified and extended form of the DHCP system for use in DoD healthcare facilities, naming it the Composite Health Care System (CHCS).

Meanwhile, in the early 1980s, major hospitals in Finland were the first institutions outside of the United States to adopt and adapt the VistA system to their language and institutional processes, creating a suite of applications called MUSTI and Multilab. (Since then, institutions in Germany, Egypt, Nigeria, and other nations abroad have adopted and adapted this system for their use, as well.)

The four major adopters of VistA – VA (VistA), DoD (CHCS), IHS (RPMS), and the Finnish Musti consortium – each took VistA in a different direction, creating related but distinct "dialects" of VistA. VA VistA and RPMS exchanged ideas and software repeatedly over the years, and RPMS periodically folded back into its code base new versions of the VA VistA packages. These two dialects are therefore the most closely related. The Musti software drifted further away from these two but retained compatibility with the infrastructure of RPMS and VA VistA (while adding additional GUI and web capabilities to improve function). Meanwhile, the CHCS code base diverged from that of the VA's VistA in the mid-eighties and has never been reintegrated. The VA and the DoD had been instructed for years to improve the sharing of medical information between the two systems, but for political reasons made little progress toward bringing the two dialects back together. More recently, CHCS's development was brought to a complete stop by continued political opposition within the DoD, and it has now been supplanted by a related, but different, system called AHLTA. While AHLTA is the new system for DoD, the core systems beneath AHLTA (for Computerized Physician Order Entry, appointing, referral management, and creation of new patient registrations) remain those of the underlying CHCS system. (While some ongoing development has occurred for CHCS, the majority of funds are consumed by the AHLTA project.) Thus, the VistA code base was split four ways.

Many VistA professionals then informally banded together as the "Hardhats" (a name the original VistA programmers used for themselves) to promote that the FOIA (Freedom of Information Act) release of VA VistA (that allows it to be in the public domain) be standardized for universal usage.

WorldVistA was formed from this group and was incorporated in March 2003 as a non-profit corporation. This allowed the WorldVistA board of directors to pursue certain activities (obtaining grants, creating contracts, and making formal alliances) that they otherwise could not pursue as an informal organization. It is, however, an organization independent of the VA system and its version of VistA therefore differs from that of the VA's. Nevertheless, it maintains as an objective that its public version be compatible (interoperable) with the VA's official version. It has developed packages of WorldVistA for multiple operating systems, including Linux (Debian/Ubuntu and Red Hat) -based and Microsoft Windows-based operating systems. Co-operation with the maintainers and vendors of OpenVistA, another widely deployed open source public version of VistA, helps maintain interoperability and a standardized framework.

In 2011 the Open Source Electronic Health Record Agent (OSEHRA) project was started (in cooperation with the Department of Veterans Affairs) to provide a common code repository for VistA (and other EHR and health IT) software. On February 10, 2020, the Open Source Electronic Health Record Alliance (OSEHRA) announced that they would cease operations on February 14, 2020.

In summary, it was the joint collaboration of thousands of clinicians and systems experts from the United States and other nations, many of them volunteers, that the VistA system has developed.

== Supporters of VistA ==
There have been many champions of VistA as the electronic healthcare record system for a universal healthcare plan. VistA can act as a standalone system, allowing self-contained management and retention of healthcare data within an institution. Combined with HIE (or other data exchange protocol) it can be part of a peer-to-peer model of universal healthcare. It is also scalable to be used as a centralized system (allowing regional or even national management of healthcare records).

In addition to the unwavering support of congressional representatives such as Congressman Sonny Montgomery of Mississippi, numerous IT specialists, physicians, and other healthcare professionals have donated significant amounts of time in adapting the VistA system for use in non-governmental healthcare settings.

The ranking member of the House Veterans Affairs Committee's Oversight and Investigation Subcommittee, Rep. Ginny Brown-Waite of Florida, recommended that the Department of Defense (DOD) adopt VA's VistA system following accusations of inefficiencies in the DOD healthcare system. The DOD hospitals use Armed Forces Health Longitudinal Technology Application (AHLTA) which has not been as successful as VistA and has not been adapted to non-military environments (as has been done with VistA).

In November 2005, the U.S. Senate passed the Wired for Health Care Quality Act, introduced by Sen. Enzi of Wyoming with 38 co-sponsors, that would require the government to use the VA's technology standards as a basis for national standards allowing all health care providers to communicate with each other as part of a nationwide health information exchange. The legislation would also authorize $280 million in grants, which would help persuade reluctant providers to invest in the new technology. There has been no action on the bill since December 2005. Two similar House bills were introduced in late 2005 and early 2006; no action has been taken on either of them, either.

In late 2008, House Ways and Means Health Subcommittee Chair Congressman Pete Stark (D-CA) introduced the Health-e Information Technology Act of 2008 (H.R. 6898) that calls for the creation of a low-cost public IT system for those providers who do not want to invest in a proprietary one.

In April 2009, Sen. John D. Rockefeller of West Virginia introduced the Health Information Technology Public Utility Act of 2009 calling for the government to create an open source electronic health records solution and offer it at little or no cost to safety-net hospitals and small rural providers.

== Detractors of VistA ==
The main complaint of VistA and CPRS is the outdated and inefficient interface, which is more similar to information systems designed in the 1990s. Given the complexity of medical care, the burden of navigated an archaic system enacts significant burden on healthcare providers, contributing to inefficiency and provider burnout.

== VistA Derivatives ==
- WorldVistA or WorldVistA EHR
- OpenVistA (Medsphere)
- vxVistA (Document Storage Systems, Inc.)
- Astronaut VistA

== See also ==
- Electronic health record
- Health informatics
- MUMPS
- Veterans Health Administration
- United States Department of Veterans Affairs
- FileMan
- VA Kernel
- GNUmed
- GNU Health
