= DAT Solutions =

American online service for haulage companies

DAT Freight & Analytics
- Formerly: Dial-a-Truck
- Type: Subsidiary
- Industry: Truckload shipping
- Founded: 1978; 48 years ago
- Headquarters: Beaverton, Oregon, United States
- Products: Transportation management software, load board apps, load tracking, freight cost benchmarking
- Services: Freight matching, Carrier verification, carrier on-boarding, asset management and compliance, invoice factoring and accounts receivable financing, operating authority, freight analytics, truckload rates
- Number of employees: 275 (2017)
- Parent: Roper Technologies
- Website: dat.com

DAT Freight & Analytics, formerly known as Dial-a-Truck, is a US-based freight exchange service ("load board") and provider of transportation information serving North America. Freight exchange services are used to match material ("loads") that needs to be shipped with over-the-road carriers, which can be hired to move those loads. DAT was established on April 3, 1978 and is part of Roper Technologies. It is co-headquartered in Denver, Colorado and Beaverton, Oregon. Jeff Clementz, President and CEO, is responsible for DAT’s strategy and execution.

== History ==
In 1958, Monroe 'Moe' Jubitz opened Fleet Leasing, Inc., a truck leasing and maintenance company in Portland, Oregon. Jubitz later expanded the company to provide fuel, food, and accommodations to truckers on the road, creating Jubitz Truck Stop.

The trucking industry was deregulated in the 1970s, encouraging independent truck drivers and small companies to find extra loads rather than returning empty. Jubitz noticed drivers hanging around his truck stop after the usual meal and shower, hoping to find a load. He decided to start signing up brokers and shippers who needed freight hauled from Portland.

Before this service, truck drivers seeking loads left handwritten notes on a bulletin board at the Jubitz Truck Stop for those brokers and shippers. Jubitz began posting available loads on a monitor at the truck stop, charging drivers a fee for the phone number of the company wanting to move freight.

in 1978, Jubitz's son, Albin Jubitz, founded Dial-A-Truck as a subsidiary of the Jubitz Corporation. By the 1980s, DAT monitors were located in hundreds of truck stops around the country, with thousands of truck drivers and shippers subscribing to the load board services. Dial-A-Truck was relabeled DAT Services in 1989. In 2001, the DAT Network was used to mobilize trucks in support of the relief efforts in the wake of the September 11 attacks.

== Services and products ==
The DAT Network hosts more than 400 million freight loads and trucks per year. The network consists of several load board subscription services for small to midsize carriers, freight brokers, and shippers.

DAT provides a real-time truckload freight rate service. This is based on $150 billion of transactions annually, from actual "broker-buy" rates (what freight brokers pay carriers) to shipper-to-carrier contract rates. The company's lane and pricing analyses can be used to make truck routing decisions.

DAT 's other products include carrier monitoring, transportation management software, and tracking systems. Additional services include trucking authority services, a free truck driver app (DAT One), freight factoring carrier onboarding, and other fleet management services.

== Ownership ==
Jubitz Corporation established DAT Services and maintained ownership through January 2001. TransCore purchased DAT Services in February 2001. (DAT's services were augmented by additional TransCore acquisitions of Viastar Services and DM Computing.) TransCore was acquired by Roper Technologies in 2004. In February 2014, DAT split off from TransCore and officially changed its name to DAT Solutions.

As of 2020, DAT has been re-branded as DAT Freight & Analytics to highlight the company's freight market intelligence offerings. In 2020, DAT acquired the Freight Market Intelligence Consortium (FMIC), a subscription-based benchmarking and analysis service, from Chainalytics.
