= Artronix =

Artronix Incorporated began in 1970 and has roots in a project in a computer science class at Washington University School of Medicine in St Louis. The class designed, built and tested a 12-bit minicomputer, which later evolved to become the PC12 minicomputer. The new company entered the bio-medical computing market with a set of peripherals and software for use in Radiation Treatment Planning (see full article and abstract) and ultrasound scanning. Software for the PC12 was written in assembly language and FORTRAN; later software was written in MUMPS. The company was located in two buildings in the Hanley Industrial Park off South Hanley Road in Maplewood, Missouri.

The company later developed another product line of brain-scanning or computed tomography equipment based on the Lockheed SUE 16-bit minicomputer (see also Pluribus); later designs included an optional vector processor using AMD Am2900 bipolar bit-slices to speed tomographic reconstruction calculations. In contrast to earlier designs, the Artronix scanner used a fan-shaped beam with 128 detectors on a rotating gantry. The system would take 540 degrees of data (1½ rotations) to average out noise in the samples. The beam allowed 3mm slices, but several slices would routinely be mathematically combined into one image for display purposes. The first generation of scanners was a head scanner while a later generation was a torso (whole-body) scanner. The CAT-3 (computerized axial tomography) system was a success at first, but the technology surrendered ground to PET (positron emission tomography) and MRI (magnetic resonance imaging) systems. Artronix closed its doors in 1978. A video of the Artronix torso scanner operating without a shroud is available on YouTube at Commissie NVvRadiologie with narration in Dutch.

Artronix was founded by Arne Roestel. Mr. Roestel went on to found Multidata Systems International. For his leadership of Artronix, Mr. Roestel was named as the Small Businessman of the Year for Missouri in 1976 by the Small Business Administration and was hosted at a luncheon by President Gerald Ford (source: Ford Library Museum).
