= VA Kernel =

The VA Kernel is a set of programs, developed by the Department of Veterans Affairs of the United States Government, which provide an operating system and MUMPS implementation independent abstraction to the VistA Hospital Information System. These programs (called 'routines' in MUMPS) are the only programs which are expected to not be written in ANSI Standard MUMPS.

The MUMPS language used in the kernel is amazingly simple, consisting of a single language (MUMPS), a single data type (string), a single data storage mechanism (global arrays stored on disk), 19 commands and 22 functions. MUMPS is a symbolic language with linguistic roots closer to LISP than Fortran or COBOL. Because of this simple software layer, the VistA software architecture has been able to adapt to changing hardware environments over the decades with only the minimum amount of software changes at higher levels of abstraction.

The CHCS system and the RPMS system have a Kernel as well, which provides a similar degree of support to those systems as the VA Kernel does to VistA.

The VA Kernel provides abstractions for:

- Menu Management (MenuMan)
- Electronic mail, group conferencing, transaction processing (MailMan)
- Login and Access Security
- Task scheduling and Batch processing
- Input/Output devices
- Protocol and Event processing
- Date processing and manipulation
- Mathematical and common library functions
