= FileMan =

Set of utilities

FileMan is a set of software utilities that provide a metadata function for MUMPS applications, usually used to process medical health records. The FileMan utilities allow the definition of data structures, menus and security, reports, and forms, reducing the level knowledge of the MUMPS programming language required to set up applications. It was written using MUMPS by George Timson in the late 1970s and early 1980s.

FileMan was designed to support the complex information storage and processing needs of hospitals. It was based on an active data dictionary that was able to invoke the full interpretive power of the MUMPS language from within a data reference. For example, a field called "Length of Stay" could invoke a MUMPS expression that would process the various dates, transfers, and discharges that would then be returned as if it were stored as a fixed data element.

The first use of FileMan was in the development of medical applications for the Veterans Administration, now called the Department of Veterans' Affairs. Since it was created by the US federal government, the source code is in the public domain. This led to it being used across a large number of organizations for the rapid development of applications, including commercial products.

MUMPS differs from many languages in its handling of the null string. A large percentage of the FileMan internal data structures are null strings, in which the information is located in the name of the "nothing" being referenced. This approach does not fit the traditional Relational Data Model.

FileMan may be used standalone, or may be used with the VA Kernel, which provides an operating system neutral environment for applications.
