= Maconomy =

- Company type: Public
- Industry: Information Technology
- Founded: 1989
- Headquarters: Copenhagen, Denmark
- Key people: Hugo Dorph (CEO)
- Products: ERP suites, Internet & Security
- Revenue: ▲DKK 220 million (2009)
- Number of employees: 211 (2009)
- Parent: Deltek
- Website: http://www.deltek.com

Maconomy was a global provider of Enterprise Resource Planning (ERP) software founded in 1989 in Denmark by Per Tejs Knudsen, Philip Dam and Ulrik Jørring. Maconomy was acquired by Deltek in 2010.

== History ==
Maconomy originates from the company PPU Software A/S, founded in Denmark in 1983. In 1989 PPU Software A/S defined a new strategy based on a new base technology, which was encapsulated in a subsidiary called PPU Maconomy A/S.

The Maconomy headquarters were located in Copenhagen, Denmark. Additionally, Maconomy had offices in five other countries: The Netherlands (Benelux), Norway, Sweden, the United Kingdom and the United States. Maconomy also had offshore development operations in Kyiv, Ukraine, and an extensive partner network in Europe, UK, India, Canada, South Africa and other countries.

Maconomy completed its initial public offering (IPO) on the OMX Nordic Exchange (formerly Copenhagen Stock Exchange) in December 2000, receiving the stock symbol MACO.

On July 6, 2010, Maconomy was acquired by Deltek.

== Software ==
Maconomy provides ERP products that it claims integrate companies’ project and finance processes into one system. Its industry specific products are aimed primarily at Professional Services Organizations, including consulting firms, marketing communications firms and other knowledge-intensive organizations.

The software itself consists of a core module featuring finance, time registration and job costing functionalities. Add-on modules such as Human Resources (HR) and Customer Relationship Management (CRM) can be integrated with the product.

Maconomy produces the resource planning product Maconomy People Planner and the business intelligence software Maconomy Analytix. Analytix has since been renamed Business Performance Management (BPM).

The first version - Maconomy 1.1 - was released in 1991.

The Deltek Maconomy ERP product is still a strategic solution in the Deltek product portfolio and sold to professional services firms all over the world. Historically sold as an on premises solution, Deltek Maconomy was launched as a SaaS solution in 2012. It is available in two different cloud versions - Deltek First Maconomy Essentials (with or without a 'Flex' offering), and Deltek Maconomy Enterprise Cloud.

The current version of Maconomy 2.4.4 was released in May 2019.
