= BHIE =

BHIE (Bidirectional Health Information Exchange) is a series of communications protocols developed by the US Department of Veterans Affairs (VA). It is used to exchange healthcare information between VA healthcare facilities nationwide and between VA facilities and Department of Defense healthcare facilities.

BHIE is one of the most widely used healthcare data exchange systems in routine healthcare use, and is used to facilitate healthcare data exchange associated with a patient's medical record.

== Types of data managed ==
Outpatient pharmacy data, allergy data, patient identification correlation, laboratory result data (including surgical pathology reports, cytology and microbiology data, chemistry and hematology data), lab orders data, radiology reports, problem lists, encounters, procedures, and clinical notes are examples of the types of healthcare data that are exchanged using BHIE.

== Integration with Electronic Health Record systems ==
BHIE is currently integrated into the VistA EMR (electronic medical record) system used nationwide in VA hospitals. VA Hospitals have regional specialized capabilities, and veterans often travel to receive specialized care. Their VistA medical records are able to be transmitted in their entirety using this protocol.

== History ==
In response to 1998 Presidential Review Directive 5, the Department of Defense (DoD), the VA, and the US Indian Health Service (IHS) collaborated to create the first developmental instances of a secure data-sharing system for electronic patient record data. This was initially called the Government Computer-based Patient Record system, or GCPR.

The development of GCPR used UML modeling tools to define the various expected use cases where medical Care Providers in any Medical Treatment Facility (MTF) would need to have access to patient records or other data from within another participating agency. The UML modeling design was selected for its ability to clearly define the business logic that would be required for the GCPR Framework and for its ability to provide detailed tracking of the iterative development of the Framework software. The UML model for the Framework is still used for the ongoing maintenance and support of the BHIE system.

Early development of the GCPR system proved that it could meet the requirements of a robust interagency data sharing system, but details of implementation, policy, and security management issues caused delays in full implementation of the GCPR system as it was originally designed. As the project progressed, the IHS withdrew from GCPR participation, and agreements between the DoD and the VA led to the GCPR Near-Term Solution (GCPR-NTS) being managed principally by the VA, with support from the DoD.

The VA installed the preliminary systems for GCPR-NTS in the VA Silver Spring, MD OIFO, where extensive testing took place between the DoD EI/DS and the VA CPRS developers. These teams worked together to finalize the needed infrastructure and security systems for one-way data transport of DoD Separatee data to the VA. The GCPR-NTS was structurally designed to house a static repository of this DoD Separatee data for use by VA Care providers. This one-way transfer of data from DoD to the VA repository continues to be one of the principal functions of the BHIE system.

Upon completion of initial testing, the VA deployed another GCPR-NTS system into the Austin Automation Center, in Austin Texas. This system became the "production" environment, which came to be known as the GCPR-Mid-Term Solution (GCPR-MTS). As the use of the system grew within the VA, it was later renamed to become the Federal Healthcare Information Exchange, or FHIE. The previously constructed system in the Silver Spring OIFO was re-tasked to become an iterative testing environment for proofing planned changes prior to deployment in the FHIE production system in Austin.

In 2004, interest in the system for use within the DoD was renewed, and further development was done to add a true bi-directional connection component to the FHIE system. Initially called the Data Sharing Initiative (DSI), adapters were added to the FHIE system using the Web Services XML-based protocol standard. A similar Web Services adapter was developed for the DoD to connect to their CHCS-I legacy patient record systems. In this way, both systems hosted a peer Web Services client that is accessible to the other with proper authentication, allowing bi-directional, query-based data exchanges between the disparate systems. Direct cross-Domain write capability and fully computable data storage and transfers are not supported at this time.

With the addition of the DSI components to the FHIE system, the entire project was renamed the Federal Bi-Directional Healthcare Information Exchange, or BHIE. All references to FHIE (other than historical) are generally being phased out. BHIE represents the previous Framework System as was deployed for the VA, and all additional capabilities added to support near-real-time data exchange between the Framework and participating DoD Medical Treatment Facilities (MTFs). In short: FHIE + DSI = BHIE.

The current BHIE Project participants are exclusively the DoD and the VA, though any number of additional domains will probably be added over time with proper development of adapters and policies. This project has the support of the VA Under-Secretary for Health, and the Acting Assistant Secretary of Defense/Health Affairs of DoD. There is also congressional interest in a successful outcome to this work.

Since 2Q-FY05, the DoD is supporting the development of a separate DoD BHIE Domain, including dedicated hardware and infrastructure to support this new system within the DISA network. The details of the DoD system are still in development, as are the details of the expected interoperability with the existing VA BHIE system.

Additional data types were added to the system during the 2005-2006 operational periods, including the provision of Discharge Summaries from selected DoD MTFs, and the inclusion of Pre-Post deployment form data availability.

In March 2006, the usage of BHIE across the country was outlined before the House Committee on Veterans Affairs.

In 2007 the DoD's AHLTA interface was connected to BHIE to allow AHLTA clinicians to see VA data and VA clinicians to see DoD data stored within the CDR. Additionally in 2007 the Theater Medical Data Store (TMDS) was connected to BHIE to allow VA and DoD clinicians to access medical records from combat theaters.

In the 2007–2009 years, a parallel “two-pass” system for exchanging imaging metadata was added to the scope of BHIE. A special-purpose server, the BHIE Imaging Adapter (BIA) was added to the other BHIE systems. This BIA server takes the first pass of an Image Study query, obtains metadata about the images for a specific patient from the BHIE system, then presents a list of available images to the end-user, who can then select the images of interest from the list. The BIA then has variable functions as an intelligent proxy for retrieving and delivering the selected images. As of 2011, other additional functions related to images are being added to both the BIA and BHIE systems.

From 2008 through 2011, the central focus of BHIE was to upgrade the system hardware and migrate all of the production functions onto the new hardware. The upgrades began in the spring of 2009, when the initial sets of hardware were delivered and development began to create a set of identical-hardware environments on which the BHIE systems' migration could occur. The migration to the new production BHIE location in Philadelphia, Pennsylvania, was accomplished in January 2011, and enhancements to all of the systems continue as an ongoing process.

The Austin "Legacy" BHIE system remained in production operation until 2011, when the replacement BHIE hardware installed in Philadelphia, Pennsylvania, assumed all of those functions. The Austin systems went dark and were retired from service in April 2011.
