= PC12 minicomputer =

PC12 by Artronix was a minicomputer built with 7400-series TTL technology and ferrite core memory. Computers were manufactured at the Artronix facility in suburban St. Louis, Missouri.

The instruction set architecture was adapted from the LINC, the only significant change was to expand addressable memory to 4K, which required addition of an origin register. It was an accumulator machine with 12-bit addresses to manipulate 12-bit data. Later versions included "origin registers" that were used to extend the addressability of memory. Arithmetic was ones' complement.

For mass storage it had a LINCtape dual unit. It also used a Tektronix screen with tube memory and an ADC/DAC to capture and display images. There was an optional plotter to draw the results. To speed up the calculations it had a separate floating point unit that interfaced like any other peripheral.

It ran an operating system LAP6-PC with support for assembly language and Fortran programming and usually came with end user software for Radiation Treatment Planning (RTP), for use by a radiation therapist or radiation oncologist, and Hospital Patient Records. Software for implant dosimetry was available for the PC12. With extended hardware it became a multiuser system running MUMPS. Latter additions included an 8" floppy disk and hard disk of larger capacity. The PC12 initially controlled the Artronix brain scanner (computed axial tomography), but this was for prototyping. The PC12 was also the core of an ultrasound system and a gamma camera system.

The PC12 was eventually superseded by the "Modulex" system built by Artronix around the 16-bit Lockheed SUE processor, roughly around 1976. The PC12 continued in production, but was phased out over time.

Sites which used the Artronix PC12 included the Lutheran Hospital Cancer Center in Moline, Illinois, where it was used to store the medical records of patients undergoing treatment for cancer. A 1974 paper describes the use of a PC12 as a frontend to an IBM 360 mainframe in radiation therapy, in which the PC12 acted as the user interface while the mainframe is used to perform complex calculations.
