= HealthShare =

Healthcare information platform

InterSystems HealthShare
- Developer: InterSystems
- Stable release: 2021.1 / March 2021
- Operating system: multiple
- Type: Strategic Healthcare Informatics Platform
- Website: www.InterSystems.com/HealthShare/

InterSystems HealthShare is a comprehensive healthcare informatics platform designed to serve hospitals, Integrated Delivery Networks (IDNs), and regional and national Health Information Exchanges (HIEs).

== About ==
HealthShare includes health information exchange, data aggregation, work flow, text analysis, and analytics technology. It connects to internal and external systems for HIE, and offers an integrated, universal view of all the data. The software also offers a real-time analytics component, called Active Analytics, that continuously collects, aggregates, normalizes, and presents data from across and beyond the organization. Because it is designed as a series of components that work securely together, HealthShare can be configured in a variety of ways, from clinical document sharing, to fully integrated private or public health information exchange. HealthShare components include:

- Foundation
- Composite Health Record
- Clinician Viewer
- Patient Index
- Provider Directory
- Terminology Engine
- Consent Management
- Clinical Message Delivery
- Active Analytics

InterSystems HealthShare has been implemented in the state of Missouri, state of Illinois, state of Rhode Island, New York eHealth Collaborative, Brooklyn Health Information Exchange (BHIX) HealthIX, Health Information Xchange of New York (Hixny), and Beaumont Health System.

== Architecture ==
The HealthShare standards-based interoperability framework provides a scalable foundation for health information exchange. It connects data, applications, processes, and users internally and externally of an organization.

Supported standards include:

- HL7
- FHIR
- IHE
- CDA
- CCD
- DICOM
- X12
- NwHIN Direct
- ITK (United Kingdom)
- NEHTA (Australia)
- DMP (France)

== Competitors ==
The main competitors are vendors of other integration engines for healthcare such as Optum, eClinical Works, dbMotion, and MEDecision.
