= Meditech =

American medical technology company

Medical Information Technology, Inc.
- Type: Private company
- Industry: Health informatics
- Founded: 1969
- Founders: Neil Pappalardo; Morton E. Ruderman; Curtis W. Marble; Jerome H. Grossman; Edward B. Roberts
- Headquarters: Westwood, Massachusetts, USA
- Key people: Howard Messing (Chairman); Lawrence A. Polimeno (Vice-Chairman); Michelle O'Connor (President and CEO)
- Products: Software
- Revenue: $493.8 million (2019)
- Website: www.meditech.com

Medical Information Technology, Inc., shortened to MEDITECH, is a privately held Massachusetts-based software and service company that develops and sells information systems for healthcare organizations.

== History ==
In 1969, Neil Pappalardo began developing the programming language MIIS. This was one of several proprietary implementations of MUMPS, a programming language which had not yet been standardized.

In July of that year, Pappalardo, Morton E. Ruderman, Curtis W. Marble, Jerome H. Grossman, and Edward B. Roberts founded the company, with a $500,000 investment from EG&G. Between 1971 and 1979, Pappalardo developed various other systems, but those associated with integrated healthcare information remained his primary focus.

In 1982, MEDITECH adopted the then-new MAGIC operating system/programming language for its health care information systems. In 1994, the company adopted client/server, a second software platform. While client/server utilized the same programming language, MAGIC runs all code on a central server, and clients are in effect dumb terminals. Client/server executes the code on a user's PC, although all code remained centralized. Client-server supports only Microsoft Windows-based operating systems. MEDITECH announced its version 6.0 in 2006.

In 2003, Howard Messing was named president, and in 2010 became chief executive officer.

MEDITECH announced the launch of Expanse, the company’s mobile, web-based EHR, on February 27, 2018.

On January 29, 2020, MEDITECH announced the launch of Expanse Patient Care, a web-based application software that allows nurses and therapists to conduct administrative tasks through a mobile device.

In 2021, Michelle O’Connor was named president and chief executive officer.

In early 2026 founder and Chairman Neil Pappalardo passed away and Howard Messing was named chairman.

== Acquisitions ==
In 2007, MEDITECH acquired Patient Care Technologies, Inc. (PtCT) and the merger was completed effective December 31, 2009.

In 2011, MEDITECH acquired LSS Data Systems, Inc. (LSS) after partnering since 1982. The merger was completed effective December 31, 2013.

In 2018, MEDITECH acquired UK-based business affiliate Centennial Computer Corporation.

== Products and services ==
MEDITECH Expanse, a web-based application showing patient history.

MEDITECH offers software for healthcare organizations of various types and sizes. Some of the software modules include: Expanse Patient Care, Physician Care Manager, MyHealth, Genomics, Expanse Navigator, Health Information Management, Revenue Cycle, as well as over 40 others.

== Partnerships ==
MEDITECH South Africa, founded in 1982, provides software and services to the healthcare industry in Africa and the Middle East. On June 6, 2012, MEDITECH announced its partnership with Intelligent Medical Objects to provide mapping of clinician-friendly diagnosis and procedure terminologies to billing codes and medical concepts.

== Locations ==
MEDITECH owns several facilities in eastern Massachusetts, located in Westwood (the main headquarters and a second office), Canton, Foxborough, Fall River, and Burlington. MEDITECH also has a facility in Atlanta, Georgia that was the former offices of Patient Care Technologies (PtCT), which is chiefly responsible for the company's Home Care line of clinical and billing software. MEDITECH also owns a building in Minnetonka, Minnesota along with global offices in Canada, The United Kingdom, Ireland, Spain, South Africa, Australia, New Zealand, Singapore, The United Arab Emirates, Pakistan, Kuwait, Mexico, and Brazil.
