= Epidemiology data for low-linear energy transfer radiation =

Epidemiological data regarding low-level radiation

Epidemiological studies of the health effects of low levels of ionizing radiation, in particular the incidence and mortality from various forms of cancer, have been carried out in different population groups exposed to such radiation. These have included survivors of the atomic bombings of Hiroshima and Nagasaki in 1945, workers at nuclear reactors, and medical patients treated with X-rays.

== Life span studies of atomic bomb survivors ==
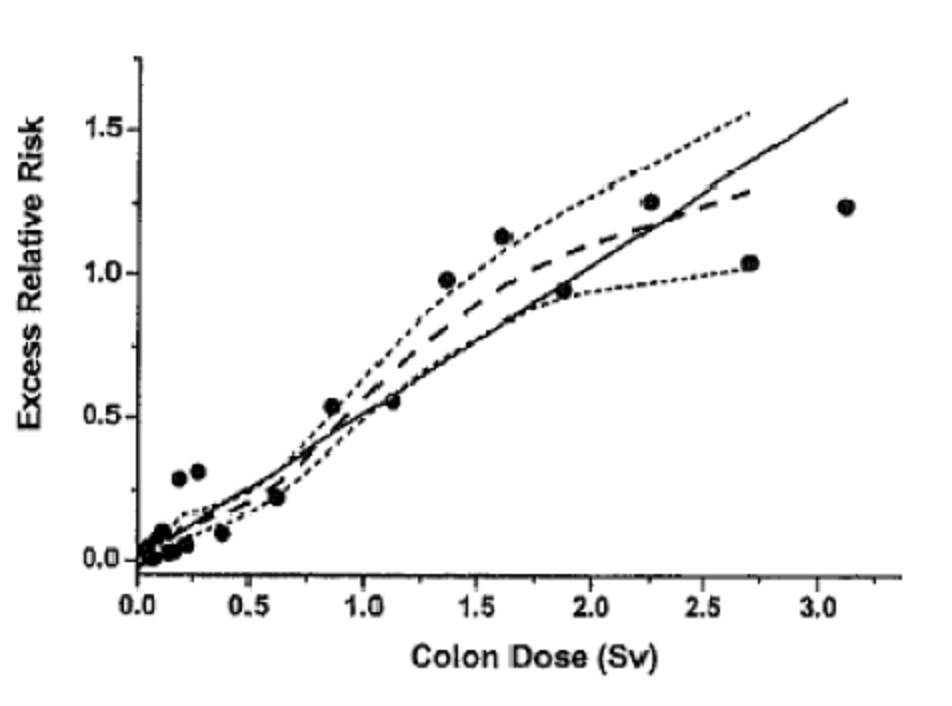
Figure 1. From Preston et al.: Solid cancer dose-response function average over gender for attained age 70 after exposure at age 30. The solid straight-line is the linear slope estimate; the points are dose-category-specific ERR estimates; the dashed curve is a smoothed estimate that is derived from the points; and the dotted curves indicate upper and lower one-stand-error bounds on the smoothed estimate.

Survivors of the atomic bomb explosions at Hiroshima and Nagasaki, Japan have been the subjects of a Life Span Study (LSS), which has provided valuable epidemiological data.

The LSS population went through several changes:

- 1945 – There were some 93,000 individuals, either living in Hiroshima or Nagasaki, Japan.
- 1950 – An additional 37,000 were registered by this time, for a total of 130,000 LSS members.

However, some 44,000 individuals were censured or excluded from the LSS project, so there remained about 86,000 people who were followed through the study. There is a gap in knowledge of the earliest cancer that developed in the first few years after the war, which impacts the assessment of leukemia to an important extent and for solid cancers to a minor extent. Table 1 shows summary statistics of the number of persons and deaths for different dose groups. These comparisons show that the doses that were received by the LSS population overlap strongly with the doses that are of concern to NASA Exploration mission (i.e., 50 to 2,000 milliSieverts (mSv)).

Table 1. Number of persons, Cancer Deaths, and Non-cancer Deaths for Different Dose Groups in the Life Span Study
	DS86 Weighted Colon Dose, mSv							
	Total	0-50	50-100	100-200	200-500	500-1,000	1,000-2,000	>2,000
No. Subjects	86,572	37,458	31,650	5,732	6,332	3,299	1,613	488
Cancer Deaths	9,335	3,833	3,277	668	763	438	274	82
Non-cancer Deaths	31,881	13,832	11,633	2,163	2,423	1,161	506	163

Figure 1 shows the dose response for the excess relative risk (ERR) for all solid cancers from Preston et al. Tables 2 and 3 show several summary parameters for tissue-specific cancer mortality risks for females and males, respectively, including estimates of ERR, excess absolute risk (EAR), and percentage attributable risks. Cancer incidence risks from low-LET radiation are about 60% higher than cancer mortality risks.

Table 2. From Preston et al.: Tissue-specific Cancer Mortality Risk Summary Statistics (i.e., ERR, EAR, and Attributable Risks) for Females and Males, RespectivelyLSS Female Site-specific Summary Mortality Rate Estimates: Solid Cancers 1950–1997
Site/System	Deaths (>0.005Sv)	ERR/Sv^{a} (90% CI)	EAR/10^{4}PY^{b} -Sv^{c} (90%CI)	Attributable risk (%)^{d}
All solid cancer	4,884 (2,948)	0.63 (0.49; 0.79)	13.5 (7.4; 16.3)	9.2 (7.4; 11.0)
Oral cavity	42 (25)	-0.20 (<-0.3; 0.75)	-0.04 (<-0.3; 0.14)	-4.1 (<-6; 14)
Digestive System				
Esophagus	67 (44)	1.7 (0.46; 3.8)	0.51 (0.15; 0.92)	22 (6.6; 42)
Stomach	1,312 (786)	0.65 (0.40; 0.95)	3.3 (2.1; 4.7)	8.8 (5.5; 12)
Colon	272 (786)	0.49 (0.11; 1.1)	0.68 (0.76; 1.3)	9.0 (4.3; 17)
Rectum	198 (127)	0.75 (0.16; 1.6)	0.69 (0.16; 1.3)	11.3 (2.6; 22)
Liver	514 (291)	0.35 (0.07; 0.72)	0.85 (0.18; 1.6)	6.2 (1.3; 12)
Gallbladder	236 (149)	0.16 (-0.17; 0.67)	0.18 (-0.21; 0.71)	2.6 (-2.9; 10)
Pancreas	244 (135)	-0.01 (-0.28; 0.45)	-0.01 (-0.35; 0.52)	-0.2 (-5.0; 7.6)
Respiratory System				
Lung	548 (348)	1.1 (0.678; 1.6)	2.5 (1.6; 3.5)	16 (10; 22)
Female breast	272; (173)	0.79 (0.29; 1.5)	1.6 (1.2; 2.2)	24 (18; 32)
Uterus	518 (323)	0.17 (-0.10; 0.52)	0.44 (-0.27; 1.3)	2.7 (-1.6; 7.9)
Ovary	136 (85)	0.94 (0.07; 2.0)	0.63 (0.23; 1.2)	15 (5.3; 28)
Urinary System				
Bladder	67 (43)	1.2 (0.10; 3.1)	0.33 (0.02; 0.74)	16 (0.9; 36)
Kidney	31 (21)	0.97 (<-0.3; 3.8)	0.14 (<-0.1; 0.42)	14 (<-3; 42)
Brain/CNS^{d}	17 (10)	0.51 (<-0.3; 3.9)	0.04 (<-0.02; 0.2)	11 (<0.05; 57)
^{a}ERR/SV for age at exposure 30 in an age-constant linear ERR model; ^{b}Excess absolute risk per 10,000 persons per year; ^{c}Average EAR computed from ERR model; ^{d}Attributable risk among survivors whose estimated dose is at least 0.005 Sv; CNS – central nervous system.

Table 3. From Preston et al.: Tissue-specific Cancer Mortality Risk Summary Statistics 9 i.e., ERR, EAR, and Attributable Risks) for MalesLSS Male Site-specific Summary Mortality Rate Estimates: Solid Cancers 1950–1997
Site/System	Deaths (>0.005Sv)	ERR/Sv^{a} (90% CI)	EAR/10^{4}PY^{b} -Sv^{c} (90%CI)	Attributable risk (%)^{d}
All solid cancer	4,451 (2,554)	0.37 (0.26; 0.49)	.6 (9.4; 16.2)	6.6 (4.9; 8.4)
Oral cavity	68 (37)	-0.20 (<-0.3; 0.45)	-0.12 (<-0.3; 0.25)	-5.2 (<-6; 11)
Digestive System				
Esophagus	224 (130)	0.61 (0.15; 1.2)	1.1 (0.28; 2.0)	11.1 (2.8; 21)
Stomach	1,555 (899)	0.20 (0.04; 0.39)	2.1 (0.43; 4.0)	3.2 (0.07; 6.2)
Colon	206 (122)	0.54 (0.13; 1.2)	1.1 (0.64; 1.9)	12 (6.9; 21)
Rectum	172 (96)	-0.25 (<-0.3; 0.15)	-0.41 (<-0.4; 0.22)	-5.4 (<-6; 3.1)
Liver	722 (408)	0.59 (0.11; 0.68)	2.4 (1.2; 4.0)	8.4 (4.2; 14)
Gallbladder	92 (52)	0.89 (0.22; 1.9)	0.63 (0.17; 1.2)	17 (4.5; 33)
Pancreas	163 (103)	-0.11 (<-0.3; 0.44)	-0.15 (<-0.4; 0.58)	--1.9 (<-6; 7.5)
Respiratory System				
Lung	716 (406)	0.48 (0.23; 0.78)	2.7 (1.4; 4.1)	9.7 (4.9; 15)
Urinary System				
Bladder	82 (56)	1.1 (0.2; 2.5)	0.7 (0.1; 1.4)	17 (3.3; 34)
Kidney	36 (18)	-0.02 (<-0.3; 1.1)	-0.01 (-0.1; 0.28)	-0.4 (<-5; 22)
Brain/CNS^{d}	14 (9)	5.3 (1.4; 16)	0.35 (0.13; 0.59)	62 (23; 100)
^{a}ERR/SV for age at exposure 30 in an age-constant linear ERR model; ^{b}Excess absolute risk per 10,000 persons per year; ^{c}Average EAR computed from ERR model; ^{d}Attributable risk among survivors whose estimated dose is at least 0.005 Sv; CNS – central nervous system.

== Other human studies ==
The BEIR VII Report contains an extensive review of data sets from human populations, including nuclear reactor workers and patients who were treated with radiation. The recent report from Cardis et al. describes a meta-analysis for reactor workers from several countries. A meta-analysis at specific cancer sites, including breast, lung, and leukemia, has also been performed. These studies require adjustments for photon energy, dose-rate, and country of origin as well as adjustments made in single population studies. Table 4 shows the results that are derived from Preston et al. for a meta-analysis of breast cancer risks in eight populations, including the atomic-bomb survivors. The median ERR varies by slightly more than a factor of two, but confidence levels significantly overlap. Adjustments for photon energy or dose-rate and fractionation have not been made. These types of analysis lend confidence to risk assessments as well as showing the limitations of such data sets.

Of special interest to NASA is the dependence on age at exposure of low-LET cancer risk projections. The BEIR VII report prefers models that show less than a 25% reduction in risk over the range from 35 to 55 years, while NCRP Report No. 132 shows about a two-fold reduction over this range.

Table 4. Results from Meta-analysis of Breast Cancer from Eight Population Groups, Including the Life Span Study of Atomic Bomb Survivors and Several Medical Patient Groups Exposed to X Rays, as described in Preston et al.Summary of Parameter Estimates for the Final Pooled ERR Model
Cohort	Reference age for the ERR/Gy estimate	ERR/Gy^{a}	Percentage change per decade increase in age at exposure	Exponent of attained age	Background SIR^{b}
LSS	attained age 50	2.10 (1.6; 2.8)	Not included^{b}	-2.0 (-2.8; -1.1)	1.01 (0.9; 1.1)
TBO	attained age 50	0.74 (0.4; 1.2)	Not included	-2.0 (-2.8; -1.1)	0.96 (0.7; 1.2)
TBX	attained age 50	0.74 (0.4; 1.2)	Not included	-2.0 (-2.8; -1.1)	0.73 (0.6; 0.9)
THY	attained age 50	0.74 (0.4; 1.2)	Not included	-2.0 (-2.8; -1.1)	1.05 (0.7; 1.5)
BBD	age at exposure 25	1.9 (1.3; 2.8)	-60% (-71%; -44%)	Not included^{c}	0.98 (0.8; 1.2)
APM	all ages	0.56 (0.3; 0.9)	Not included	Not included	1.45 (1.1; 1.8)
HMG	all ages	0.34 (0.1; 0.7)	Not included	Not included	1.07 (0.8; 1.3)
HMS	all ages	0.34 (0.1; 0.7)	Not included	Not included	1.05 (0.9; 1.2)
^{a} C.I.'s within parentheses; ^{b}SIR = standardized incidence ratio; ^{c}"Not included" means that the risk is assumed not to vary with age at exposure (attained age).

== See also ==
- Radiobiology
