= Roper Technologies =

American diversified industrial company

Roper Technologies, Inc.
- Formerly: Roper Industries, Inc.
- Type: Public
- Traded as: Nasdaq: ROP; Nasdaq-100 component; S&P 500 component; Fortune 500 component
- Industry: Conglomerate
- Founded: 1890; 136 years ago
- Founder: George D. Roper
- Headquarters: Sarasota, Florida, U.S.
- Key people: Neil Hunn (President & CEO); Amy Woods Brinkley (Chair)
- Products: Industrial technology, radio frequency (RF) technology, scientific and industrial imaging, energy systems and controls, and instrumentation
- Revenue: ▲US$7.09 billion (2025)
- Operating income: ▲US$2.24 billion (2025)
- Net income: ▼US$1.54 billion (2025)
- Total assets: ▲US$34.6 billion (2025)
- Total equity: ▲US$19.9 billion (2025)
- Number of employees: 19,400 (2025)
- Subsidiaries: DAT Solutions
- Website: www.ropertech.com

Roper Technologies, Inc. is a holding company that owns companies in the technology sector.

The company operates three divisions: Application Software (55% of 2024 revenues), which includes Aderant, Clinisys, Data Innovations, Deltek, Frontline, IntelliTrans, PowerPlan, Procare, Strata, Transact/CBORD, and Vertafore; Network Software (21% of 2024 revenues), which includes ConstructConnect, DAT Solutions, The Foundry Visionmongers, iPipeline, iTradeNetwork, Loadlink, MHA, SHP, and SoftWriters; and Technology Enabled Products (24% of 2024 revenues), which includes CIVCO Medical Solutions, FMI, Inovonics, IPA, Neptune, Northern Digital, rf IDEAS, and Verathon.

== History ==
George D. Roper founded the company in 1890 as a manufacturer of home appliances, pumps, and other industrial products. He had part ownership of the Van Wie Gas Stove Company of Cleveland. The Van Wie plant moved to Rockford, Illinois and passed into the hands trustees in the early 1890s. George D. Roper became the sole owner of the Van Wie Gas Stove company after the company's debts had been paid off on September 1, 1894. Ten days later, a fire destroyed the facility. The factory was rebuilt and renamed as the Eclipse Gas Stove Company, and later expanded in 1906 to include the Trahern Pump Company, founded in 1857.

In 1957, Roper sold his stove business to Florence Stove Co. of Kankakee, Illinois. The stoves continued to operate under the name George D. Roper, despite the original company changing its name to Roper Pump Company.

In 1966, Roper acquired David Bradley Manufacturing Works from Sears Roebuck & Co..

In 1981, Dexter Corporation acquired the company.

In 1982, Roper moved his appliance production factory (originally Florence Stove Company) from Kankakee, Illinois to a plant in LaFayette, Georgia. The Kankakee factory was razed in 2016.

In 1988, Electrolux purchased Roper's lawn and garden products division.

In 1989, Whirlpool Corporation acquired the Roper brand.

In 1992, the company once again became a public company via an initial public offering.

Between 2001 and 2018, Brian Jellison, a former executive of General Electric and Ingersoll-Rand, served as CEO.

In April 2015, Roper Industries Inc. changed its corporate name to Roper Technologies, Inc.

=== Acquisitions ===
#	Year	Company	Price	Description of Assets	Ref(s).
1	July 2012	Sunquest Information Systems	$1.42 billion	Diagnostic and laboratory software	
2	October 2016	ConstructConnect	$632 million	Software for the commercial construction industry	
3	December 2016	Deltek	$2.8 billion	Enterprise software for project-based businesses	
4	August 2020	Vertafore	$5.35 billion	Software for the property and casualty insurance industry	
5	October 2022	Frontline Education	$3.725 billion	Administration software for educators in K-12	
6	August 2023	Syntellis Performance Solutions	$1.25 billion	Business performance management software, data, and intelligence	
7	August 2024	Transact Campus	$1.5 billion	Technology services for improving campus life	
