= Neil Pappalardo =

American technology businessman (1942–2026)

A. Neil Pappalardo
- Born: 1942; Rochester, New York, U.S.
- Died: January 27, 2026 (aged 83)
- Education: Massachusetts Institute of Technology
- Occupation: Technology businessman
- Known for: Chairman of Meditech; Co-developer of MUMPS

Antonino Neil Pappalardo (April 21, 1942 – January 27, 2026) was an American technology businessman and the founder of Meditech, a supplier of information system software for hospitals headquartered in Massachusetts. Pappalardo co-founded Meditech in 1969, with the original name Medical Information Technology Inc. He was one of the original co-developers of the MUMPS programming language and system at Massachusetts General Hospital.

== Early life ==
Pappalardo was a native of Rochester, New York, born to Sicilian immigrant parents. He graduated in 1960 from McQuaid Jesuit High School and in 1964 received a Bachelor of Science degree in Physics and Electrical Engineering from the Massachusetts Institute of Technology (MIT) in Cambridge, Massachusetts. Pappalardo received an Honorary Doctorate degree from Suffolk University in 1996 and an Honorary Doctor of Engineering degree from the Korean Advanced Institute of Science and Technology (KAIST) in 2007.

== Career ==
=== Early career ===
Starting at age 13, he worked summers as a mason before getting a job at Bausch & Lomb designing circuits. Shortly after graduating with his B.S. in 1964, Pappalardo went to work at Massachusetts General Hospital in Boston, Massachusetts after meeting Dr. G. Octo Barnett, MD during his MIT thesis work. There, he worked in Barnett's lab within the Laboratory of Computer Science on a “hospital computer project” in conjunction with Bolt Beranek and Newman, Inc (BBN), a research and computing consulting firm.

=== MUMPS ===
The project at Massachusetts General Hospital would become the MGH Utility Multi-Programming System (MUMPS) and later the Meditech Interpretive Information System (MIIS), developed between 1964 and 1971. Pappalardo was credited with co-development alongside Barnett, Robert Greenes, and Curt Marble. The MUMPS programming language was supported with a grant from the National Center for Health Services Research and a contract from the National Institutes of Health (NIH).

=== MEDITECH ===
Pappalardo cofounded MEDITECH (originally Medical Information Technology Inc.) in 1968 with Barnett, Marble, Morton Ruderman, and Jerome Grossman and opened for business in the August 1969. The company's first headquarters were located in East Cambridge, Massachusetts; they moved to Westwood, Massachusetts in 1983. Pappalardo served as CEO and President until 1994, when he became Chairman. As of 2023, Pappalardo served as founder, chairman, and board member.

== Personal life and death ==
Pappalardo lived in Boston, Massachusetts with his wife, Jane. They met during his senior year at MIT, and married in 1964. They have four children including Missy, born August 4, 1969, the same day that Meditech was launched.

Pappalardo was a life member emeritus of the MIT Corporation.

From 1999 until his death, Pappalardo supported physicists in MIT's Department of Physics via a postdoctoral research fellowship, the Pappalardo Fellowships in Physics.

Pappalardo died on January 27, 2026, at the age of 83.
