= Amy Woods Brinkley =

American banker

Amy Woods Brinkley is an American business executive who was the Global Risk Executive of Bank of America from 2001 to 2009. At the age of 53 in June 2009, she and CEO Ken Lewis "agreed she would retire," according to a New York Times report, after a surge in credit losses led to a government bailout and orders by regulators to raise $33.9 billion of capital (Reuters). She was elected to the board of directors of Roper Technologies in 2015.

Brinkley was awarded the top position on US Banker magazine's 2005 list of "Most Powerful Women in Banking," and was number 23 on Fortune's "50 Most Powerful Women in Business" in 2006 and 2007 and 22nd in 2008, when she was reported to be "a possible candidate to succeed ... Ken Lewis." Brinkley was named to the Fortune 500 list nine consecutive years. Additionally, The Wall Street Journal and Forbes cited her as one of the leading women in business.

Brinkley graduated Phi Beta Kappa from the University of North Carolina at Chapel Hill. She serves on the Bank of America Charitable Foundation Board of Directors. She also serves as a trustee for both the Princeton Theological Seminary and the Carolinas HealthCare System. She is a member of the governing board of the Carolina Thread Trail. Previously, she served on the Institute of International Finance Board of Directors and the President's Commission on White House Fellowships and participated in the annual World Economic Forum in Davos, Switzerland.

== Bank of America ==
As head of the Bank's risk department, Brinkley was tasked with protecting the Bank from all kinds of risk, ranging from human resources-related factors to interest rate fluctuations and credit risk.

According to the New York Times, "she was at Mr. Lewis’s side as the bank rapidly expanded its credit card and home equity lending, businesses that are causing charge-offs for the bank." Her most recent assignment was as "the point person between the bank and the regulators during the stress tests." As to compensation, "Ms. Brinkley received no bonus last year. But she took home at least $37.2 million during her tenure as Bank of America’s risk chief from 2001 to 2007, according to an analysis by Equilar, a compensation research firm. She is also entitled to pension benefits worth more than $12 million and potentially millions more in deferred pay and accumulated stock. The figures are based on the 2008 proxy statement, the last time data was publicly available."

Brinkley joined the Bank of America organization in 1978 as a Commercial Credit Department management trainee for NCNB. From 1993 to 2001, she served first as the company's Marketing executive and then as president of its Consumer Products division.

== Personal life ==
Brinkley lives in Charlotte, North Carolina, where she is an active voice for the community's health and human services needs, in particular those of families and children. She has worked with the Critical Needs Task Force, the Crossroads Charlotte Initiative, and the Council for Children's Rights.

Brinkley is married with children, and in recent years her husband, a lawyer, has stayed at home with the children.
