= Chainalytics =

Defunct American supply chain consulting, analytics, and market intelligence firm

- Company type: Privately held company
- Industry: Logistics and Supply Chain Consultancy
- Founded: September 17, 2001; 23 years ago
- Defunct: December 22, 2021
- Fate: Acquired
- Successor: NTT Data
- Headquarters: Atlanta, United States
- Area served: Worldwide
- Key people: Mike Kilgore (Chief Executive Officer); Irv Grossman (Executive Vice President); Dan K. Lowring (CFO & General Counsel); Ken Justin (Chief Technology Officer)
- Products: Supply chain consulting, data analytics
- Number of employees: 200+ (2020)
- Website: www.chainalytics.com

Chainalytics was an American supply chain consulting, analytics, and market intelligence firm with locations across North America, Europe, and Asia-Pacific. The company was acquired in 2021 by NTT Data.

== History ==
The company was founded in 2001 in Atlanta Georgia and made a number of acquisitions over the years.

In 2011, it acquired Packaging Solutions Business From Adalis Corporation; The Adalis packaging engineering services and consulting team, located in Minnesota, formed a new practice within Chainalytics to focus on optimizing supply chain packaging and reducing package damage, materials and logistics costs. Tom Blanck joined as Principal of packaging optimization practice.

That same year, in 2011, it acquired Chainnovations, a supply chain management consultancy; This company brought experience in the area of service supply chains, encompassing reverse logistics, after-sales service, and service-centric networks. Chainnovations’ founder and managing partner, Irv Grossman, joined as vice president for Supply Chain Operations Practice.

In 2013, it acquired ROCE Partners', a pan-European supply chain management consultancy with offices in Helsinki, Milan, and Stockholm; With the addition, Chainalytics expanded its geographic coverage and gained capabilities in the areas of sales and operations planning (S&OP) and demand-supply planning. Janne Salmi, former Chairman of the Board at ROCE Partners, continued as Managing Director of Chainalytics Europe and lead of the global S&OP Practice.

In 2014, the company acquired Logiworx, Australian Supply Chain & Logistics Firm; Since 2009, Chainalytics and Logiworx had partnered in multiple supply chain management projects in the Asia-Pacific region. Through acquisitions, Chainalytics gained expertise in verticals such as mining, metals, oil and gas, as well as extending capacity in supply management and procurement of direct and indirect materials. Logiworx partner and co-founder Tim Foster took on the role of Managing Director for Asia-Pacific.

In 2021, the company was acquired by Japanese information technology multinational NTT Data.

== Offices ==
- North America - Atlanta, GA
- North America - Minneapolis, MN
- India - Bengaluru, India
- Europe - Amsterdam, Netherlands
- Europe - Tampere, Finland
- Europe - Milan, Italy
