= Multidata Systems International =

Multidata Systems International is a maker of radiation therapy products based in St. Louis, Missouri. Their major product lines include realtime dosimetry or RTD, which includes 3D water phantoms, Film dosimetry and air scanners. Since 2003, Multidata has been under a Consent Decree of Permanent Injunction entered by the U.S. District Court for the Eastern District of Missouri for the US FDA. The consent decree prohibits the company from designing, manufacturing, processing, and distributing medical devices, among other restrictions.

== Products ==
Multidata Systems was started in 1980 to provide medical physics solutions for radiation oncology. The RTD Real Time Dosimetry product line includes 1D and 3D water phantoms (field analyzers) for measuring the output of a treatment machine as used in radiation therapy. Three-dimensional datasets are required for the commissioning of such treatment machines, for the subsequent modeling of the radiation beam in the treatment planning software and for the calculation of dose to be delivered. A water phantom or field analyzer may also be used for periodical quality assurance measurements on an annual or semi-annual basis.

Other RTD equipment includes software and phantom accessories for a wide variety of quality assurance tasks in clinical radiation therapy, including the verification of treatment plans and tools for the documentation and comparison of delivered and planned dose.

The DSS (decision support system) treatment planning system followed RTP-123 and RTP/2 as one of the most widely used treatment planning systems commercially available. The DSS was widely popular due to its speed and the transparency of its calculation methods. The RTSuite product was designed to integrate plan verification methods with other planning and dosimetry tools in one user interface.

The software-driven MultiCut block mold cutting system is designed for cutting molds for the production of shielding blocks as used in radiation therapy.

== History ==
Founded in 1979 in St. Louis, Missouri by Arne Roestel, the company entered the market with the first computerized water phantom system (a scanner for measuring radiation fields as used in hospitals for radiation therapy) while developing and building computers using the all new multi-tasking microprocessor technology. The company name “Multidata” reflected this focus and its founder’s mission to develop the industry’s first desktop computer for microcomputer-controlled instrumentation.

In 1982, the company introduced the first software-driven scanning system (CDS-III Clinical Dosimetry System, for film and water based scanning), obsoleting the external controller hardware previously required to interface with scanning instrumentation. The company collaborated to make radiation field datasets scanned with the dosimetry system compatible for use with the Memorial Sloan Kettering treatment dose calculation service, a project which later evolved into its first own radiation treatment planning software, RTP-123, released in 1987. Subsequent product generations included RTP/2, DSS (Decision Support System), DSS/2, DSS/3 3D for CRT and RTSuite.

== Accident ==
A software product of the company was involved in an accidental overexposure of patients in Panama in 2001 when the treatment planning software RTP/2 (vers. 2.11, 1991) reportedly contributed to 28 patients receiving excessive amounts of radiation at the Instituto Oncologico Nacional in Panama City. At least eight patients died, while another 20 received overdoses likely to cause significant health problems. The physicians, who were legally required to double-check the computer's calculations by hand, were indicted for murder.

A panel of experts designated by the International Atomic Energy Agency delivered a comprehensive report in August 2001, finding that the software permitted incorrect forms of data entry which in turn had led to miscalculation of treatment times. Multidata began a recall and in-field correction of its radiation treatment planning software in September 2001 with the issue of a software correction and detailed description of the cause and circumstances of the incorrect data entry.
