= InterSystems Caché =

Commercial operational database management system

- Developer: InterSystems
- Initial release: 1997; 29 years ago
- Stable release: 2018.1.4 / May 17, 2020; 5 years ago
- Operating system: multiple
- Type: database management and application development
- License: Proprietary
- Website: InterSystems.com

InterSystems Caché (/kæʃeɪ/ kashay) is a commercial operational database management system from InterSystems, used to develop software applications for healthcare management, banking and financial services, government, and other sectors. Customer software can use the database with object and SQL code. Caché also allows developers to directly manipulate its underlying data structures: hierarchical arrays known as M technology.

== Description ==
Internally, Caché stores data in multidimensional arrays capable of carrying hierarchically structured data. These are the same “global” data structures used by the MUMPS programming language, which influenced the design of Caché, and are similar to those used by MultiValue (also known as PICK) systems. In most applications, however, object and/or SQL access methods are used.

Caché ObjectScript, Caché Basic or SQL can be used to develop application business logic. External interfaces include native object binding for C++, Java, EJB, ActiveX, and .NET. Caché supports JDBC and ODBC for relational access. XML and web services are also supported.

Caché Server Pages (CSP) technology allows tag-based creation of web applications that generate dynamic web pages, typically using data from a Caché database. Caché also includes InterSystems Zen, an implementation of AJAX that enables component-based development of rich web applications.

== History ==
InterSystems was founded in 1979 to commercialize MUMPS hierarchical databases. It launched Caché in 1997 as its flagship product and at that time ceased further development of its original MUMPS product line.

== Market ==
Caché is used as part of hospital patient tracking, electronic medical record and medicine management systems, in products developed by companies such as Epic Systems as well as the VistA system used by the U.S. Department of Veteran Affairs.

The DB-Engines website ranked Caché as the most popular object-oriented DBMS every month from March 2013 to January 2023, when it was overtaken by InterSystems IRIS Data Platform.

== Platforms ==
Caché runs on Windows, Linux, Solaris, HP-UX, AIX, macOS and OpenVMS platforms.

== See also ==
- GT.M, a related database system
