= InterSystems =

American technology company

InterSystems Corporation
- Type: Private
- Industry: software
- Founded: 1978
- Founder: Phillip (Terry) Ragon
- Headquarters: Boston, Massachusetts
- Key people: Phillip (Terry) Ragon, Founder and CEO
- Products: InterSystems IRIS; InterSystems IRIS for Health; Caché; Ensemble; DeepSee; HealthShare; TrakCare; GlobalsDB
- Revenue: $1 billion+ (USD) (FY2024)
- Website: www.InterSystems.com

InterSystems Corporation is a privately held vendor of software systems and technology for high-performance database management, rapid application development, integration, and healthcare information systems. The vendor's products include InterSystems IRIS Data Platform, Caché Database Management System (now largely superseded by IRIS), the InterSystems Ensemble integration platform (more recently marketed as HealthShare Health Connect), the HealthShare healthcare informatics platform and TrakCare healthcare information system, which is sold outside the United States.

InterSystems is headquartered at One Congress in Boston, Massachusetts. A privately held company, InterSystems reached a significant financial milestone in 2023 by surpassing $1 billion in annual revenue. As of 2024, the company reported annual revenues exceeding $1.1 billion and employs approximately 2,400 people worldwide. Its technology is a primary driver in the healthcare sector, where it is estimated to manage records for over one billion patients.

== History ==
InterSystems was founded in 1978 by Phillip T. (Terry) Ragon, its current CEO. The firm was one of the vendors of M-technology (aka MUMPS) systems, with a product called ISM-11 (an DSM-11 clone) for the DEC PDP-11 . Over the years, it acquired several other MUMPS implementations: DTM from Data Tree (1993); DSM from Digital (1995); and MSM from Micronetics (1998); making InterSystems the dominant M technology vendor.

The firm eventually started combining features from these products into one they called OpenM, then consolidated the technologies into a product, Caché, in 1997. Caché offered several new important features, not available in MUMPS offerings, including support for web, object-oriented development and SQL access to the database. At that time they stopped new development for all of their legacy M-based products (although the company still supports existing customers). They launched Ensemble, an integration platform, in 2003 and HealthShare, a scalable health informatics platform, in 2006. In 2007, InterSystems purchased TrakHealth, an Australian vendor of TrakCare, a modular healthcare information system based on InterSystems technology. In May 2011, the firm launched Globals as a free database based on the multi-dimensional array storage technology used in Caché. In September 2011, InterSystems purchased Siemens Health Services (SHS) France from its parent company, Siemens. In September 2017, InterSystems announced InterSystems IRIS Data Platform, which, the company said, combines database management capabilities together with interoperability and analytics, as well as technologies such as sharding for performance.

== Microsoft dispute ==
On August 14, 2008, the Boston Globe reported that InterSystems was filing a lawsuit against Microsoft Corporation, another tenant in its Cambridge, Mass., headquarters, seeking to prevent Microsoft from expanding in the building. InterSystems also filed a lawsuit against building owner Equity Office Partners, a subsidiary of the Blackstone Group, "contending that it conspired with Microsoft to lease space that InterSystems had rights to, and sought to drive up rents in the process".

In 2010, CEO Terry Ragon led a coalition in Cambridge called Save Our Skyline to protest a city zoning change that would have allowed more signs on top of commercial buildings, partly in response to Microsoft's desire to put a sign on top of their shared building.

Both disputes were eventually settled, and Microsoft and InterSystems agreed to both put low signs only in front of the building at street level.
