= Committee on the Biological Effects of Ionizing Radiation =

Committee of the US National Research Council

The Committee on the Biological Effects of Ionizing Radiation (BEIR) is a committee of the American National Research Council. It publishes reports on the effects of ionizing radiation.

== Reports ==
- BEIR I 1972: “The Effects on Populations of Exposure to Low Levels of Ionizing Radiation”
- BEIR II 1977: “Considerations of Health Benefit-Cost Analysis for Activities Involving Ionizing Radiation Exposure and Alternatives”
- BEIR III 1980: “The Effects on Populations of Exposure to Low Levels of Ionizing Radiation”
- BEIR IV 1988: “Health Effects of Radon and Other Internally Deposited Alpha-Emitters”
- BEIR V 1990: “Health Effects of Exposure to Low Levels of Ionizing Radiation”
- BEIR VI 1999: “The Health Effects of Exposure to Indoor Radon”
- BEIR VII, Phase 1 1998: “Health Risks from Exposure to Low Levels of Ionizing Radiation, Phase 1”
- BEIR VII, Phase 2 2006: “Health Risks from Exposure to Low Levels of Ionizing Radiation, Phase 2”
