= LSS Data Systems =

American medical software and service company

- Type: Private
- Industry: Electronic Health Records
- Founded: 1982
- Headquarters: Eden Prairie, Minnesota
- Key people: Ken Carlson, former CEO; Stephanie Petersen, former President & COO; Joanne Wood, former President & COO
- Products: EHR and Practice Management Software
- Number of employees: 200
- Website: www.lssdata.com

LSS Data Systems (LSS) was a medical software and service company based in Minnesota, United States. The company developed products for physicians and was founded in 1982. LSS partnered with Medical Information Technology (MEDITECH) in 1982. Together, they developed physician practice management and ambulatory electronic health record software. In 2000 and 2001, MEDITECH invested in LSS and eventually acquired complete ownership of the company in February 2011. After the acquisition, LSS became a wholly owned subsidiary of MEDITECH, a Massachusetts-based company. The company later announced the completion of the merger on January 1, 2014.

== History ==
"Lake Superior Software" was founded in 1982 in Duluth, Minnesota by Ken Carlson and Stephanie Petersen to develop and support physician billing and practice management software. The company developed a national clientele, opened an office just outside Minneapolis in the mid-1980s, and changed its name to "LSS Data Systems." Beginning in 1990, the company’s physician practice management system was redeveloped and re-written utilizing the MEDITECH developed programming language MAGIC.

LSS began development of a client/server system in 1996. LSS released patient clinical record software Electronic Ambulatory Record (EAR) in 2000. Application suite Medical and Practice Management (MPM) was jointly developed by LSS and MEDITECH and released in 2002. The MPM suite consists of LSS's physician billing and practice management application (PBR) and Electronic Ambulatory Record (EAR), the suite meshes together applications jointly developed with MEDITECH, including scheduling, order management, scanning and a web-based patient portal.

Joanne Wood was appointed as president and COO of LSS Data Systems in February 2011 during the company's acquisition. She was also VP of client services at MEDITECH, at that time.

== Products and services ==
LSS developed electronic medical software for physician practices associated with or located in communities with hospitals using MEDITECH health care information systems. Several LSS products have been certified by the Certification Commission for Healthcare Information Technology (CCHIT).

- 2008 Certification [additionally certified for Child Health] pending completion of advanced ePrescribing requirements: Medical and Practice Management Suite, Client Server Version 5.6
- 2007 Certification: http://www.cchit.org/products/2007/ambulatory/661 Medical and Practice Management Suite, Client Server Version 5.56]
- 2007 Certification: Medical and Practice Management Suite, Client Server Version 5.55
- 2007 Certification: Medical and Practice Management Suite, Client Server Version 5.54
- 2006 Certification: Medical and Practice Management Suite, MAGIC Version 5.6

LSS since certified products to be compliant with the Stage 1 Meaningful Use Standards identified by the Office of the National Coordinator for Health Information Technology with Drummond Group Inc. (see certified product info below). It has other electronic health record (EHR) products.

Product Name	Certified through	Type	Certification ID Number	Clinical Quality Measures	Additional software used
Medical and Practice Management (MPM) MAGIC v5.6.4	2012	Complete EHR-Ambulatory	12172010-4212-1	NQF: 0013, 0024, 0028, 0038, 0041, 0043, 0059, 0075, 0421	DrFirst; Spreadsheet; Email software
Medical and Practice Management (MPM) Client Server v5.6.4	2012	Complete EHR-Ambulatory	01192011-4212-8	NQF: 0013, 0024, 0028, 0038, 0041, 0043, 0059, 0075, 0421	DrFirst; Email software; spreadsheet software

== LSS & MEDITECH Integration ==
As a MEDITECH company, LSS develops its software using the same programming tools and technologies as MEDITECH, forming an integrated suite of products for health care organizations. The use of shared tools and system conventions with MEDITECH makes the user interface similar and consistent for clinicians in multiple care settings.
