= Deltek =

American software company

- Industry: Enterprise software; Business software; Cloud computing; Computer hardware; Consulting
- Founded: 1983
- Founder: Donald deLaski; Kenneth E. deLaski
- Headquarters: Herndon, VA
- Area served: Worldwide
- Number of employees: 3,686
- Parent: Roper Technologies
- Website: www.deltek.com/en

Deltek is an American multinational enterprise software and information solutions corporation headquartered in Herndon, Virginia. The company sells software to government contractors, engineering, architectural, accounting, and consulting firms to manage customer information, financial and project accounting, project management, risk management, enterprise resource planning, invoicing, revenue, financial compliance, and expenses. Since 2016, its parent company has been Roper Technologies. Bob Hughes is Deltek's president and CEO.

== History ==
Deltek was founded in 1983 as Deltek Systems by father and son Donald and Kenneth E. deLaski (Deltek was short for deLaski Technologies). The company had a successful IPO in 1997 and was publicly traded until 2002. After the tech bubble burst in the early 2000s, the company went private again. Then, in 2005, the private equity firm New Mountain Capital bought 75% of Deltek's shares. In 2006, the company had around 11,000 customers, including Bechtel Corp., HOK, and Verizon. Deltek went public for the second time in 2007, and raised $162 million with its initial public offering (IPO). New Mountain reduced its stake in the company from 75% to around 59%.

In July 2012, Deltek put itself up for sale. At the time, the company had a market value of around $800 million. In August, the company was bought by Thoma Bravo LLC for $1.1 billion and again went private. In 2013, Michael Corkery was named president and CEO, and Michael Krone was named the CFO. In July 2016, Deltek acquired the Nottingham, UK-based company Union Square Software. Also in 2016, Deltek became part of Roper Technologies' portfolio of companies when Roper acquired Deltek for $2.8 billion. In 2020, the company had approximately 3,000 employees in over 12 locations around the world. In 2023, Deltek claimed 95% of public sector spending across the U.S. federal, state, local, and education market, and public sector spending in Canada. In Europe, the company mainly works with consultants, architecture firms, and engineering firms.

In 2022 and 2023, Deltek was named one of America's best mid-sized employers by Forbes and Statista Inc. In 2022, the Washington Post included Deltek as one of the Top Workplaces of 2022. Deltek is also rated TSIA Outstanding and has the J.D. Power Certified Assisted Technical Support certification.
