= Sunquest Information Systems =

U.S. developer of medical laboratory and diagnostic software

Sunquest Information Systems Inc.
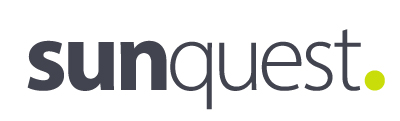
- Type: Subsidiary
- Industry: Health information technology
- Founded: 1979
- Headquarters: 3300 E Sunrise Drive, Tucson, AZ, United States
- Parent: Roper Technologies
- Website: www.sunquestinfo.com

Sunquest Information Systems Inc. is a U.S. developer of medical laboratory and diagnostic software. It was founded in 1979 and as of 2012, is a subsidiary of Roper Technologies. Sunquest software includes clinical diagnostic data management, blood bank data management, molecular diagnostics analysis and reporting, and multi-laboratory inter-connectivity.

== History ==
Sunquest Information Systems Inc. was founded in 1979 by technologists Jim Peebles and Bob Morrison and pathologist Dr. Sidney Goldblatt. In June 1996, the company began publicly trading on NASDAQ as SUNQ and also acquired Antrim, a commercial laboratory and financial information system supplier. Sunquest itself was acquired in 2001 by UK-based public company Misys plc, and became the Hospital Systems Division of Misys Healthcare.

In October 2007, the diagnostic information portion of the Misys business was spun off and acquired by Vista Equity Partners of San Francisco. Upon re-emerging as a privately held business, Sunquest took its original name. Sunquest purchased the Outreach Advantage(r) suite from Pathology Associates Medical Laboratory (PAML) in January 2009.

In 2008, Sunquest Information Systems introduced the idea of the Five Rights of Laboratory Testing to promote the idea that diagnostic laboratories play a role in patient safety. In 2012, Sunquest was acquired by Roper Technologies. Some Sunquest clients include the Henry Ford Health System, The Cleveland Clinic, University of Pittsburgh Medical Center and Public Health Authority (Bahamas).

== Products ==
Different software products are intended for laboratory applications or to support facility operations. Some areas of medical focus include: microbiology, blood bank, pathology, virology, molecular diagnostics, and cytogenetics. One software product is the Collection and Transfusion Manager, a barcode-based specimen tracking system intended to reduce identification errors and increase personnel efficiency.
