= HIV/AIDS in South Africa =

Health concern in South Africa

Estimated HIV prevalence among adults aged 15-49 by country in 2007

HIV/AIDS is one of the most serious health concerns in South Africa. South Africa has the highest number of people afflicted with HIV of any country, and the fourth-highest adult HIV prevalence rate, according to the 2019 United Nations statistics. As of 2022, about 8 million South Africans, out of a total population of 60 million, were living with HIV.

According to a UNAIDS dataset sourced from the World Bank, in 2019 the HIV prevalence rate for adults aged 15 to 49 was 27% in Eswatini (Swaziland), 25% in Lesotho, 25% in Botswana and 19% in South Africa.

== Understanding HIV prevalence ==
HIV prevalence does not indicate that a country has an AIDS crisis, as HIV and AIDS are separate conditions. HIV prevalence, instead, indicates that people remain alive despite the infection. South Africa has the largest HIV treatment programme in the world.

World Bank Open data explains the data it publishes on HIV prevalence as follows:

HIV prevalence rates reflect the rate of HIV infection in each country's population. Low national prevalence rates can be misleading, however. They often mask epidemics that are initially concentrated in specific localities or population groups and threaten to spread to the broader population. In many developing countries, most new infections occur in young adults, with young women especially vulnerable.

Data on HIV are from the Joint United Nations Programme on HIV/AIDS (UNAIDS). Changes in procedures and assumptions for estimating the data and better coordination with countries have resulted in improved estimates of HIV and AIDS. The models, which are routinely updated, track the course of HIV epidemics and their impact, making full use of information on HIV prevalence trends from surveillance and survey data.

The models take into account reduced infectivity among people receiving antiretroviral therapy (which is having a larger impact on HIV prevalence and allowing HIV-positive people to live longer) and allow for changes in urbanization over time in generalized epidemics. The estimates include plausibility bounds that reflect the certainty associated with each estimate.

South Africa's HIV treatment programme was launched in earnest in 2005. The trend in South Africa's HIV and AIDS statistics has changed significantly in the years since then.

== Latest data on HIV prevalence in South Africa ==
The World Bank and United Nations source their data on HIV prevalence from Statistics South Africa.

According to Statistics South Africa's mid-year population estimates for 2018, the total HIV prevalence rate for the country is 13.1%. The HIV prevalence rate for all adults aged 15 to 49 is 19.0%.Statistics South Africa estimates the number of deaths attributable to AIDS in 2017 as 126,755 or 25.03% of all South African deaths.

== Other statistics ==
=== By race ===
A 2008 study revealed that HIV/AIDS infection in South Africa was distinctly divided along racial lines: 13.6% of Black Africans in South Africa are HIV-positive, whereas only 0.3% of Whites living in South Africa have the disease. False traditional beliefs about HIV/AIDS, which contribute to the spread of the disease, persist in townships due to the lack of education and awareness programmes in these regions. Sexual violence and local attitudes toward HIV/AIDS have also amplified the epidemic.

=== By gender ===
HIV/AIDS is more prevalent among females, especially those under the age of 40. Women made up roughly 4 in every 5 people with HIV/AIDS aged 20–24, and 2 out of 3 of those aged 25–29. Although prevalence is higher among women in general, only 1 in every 6 HIV/AIDS infected people with multiple sex partners is a woman.

According to a study published in late 2019, men who have sex with men (MSM) are at higher risk of HIV infection than men in the general population. Prevalence rates of HIV infection among MSM varied from 6 to 37% depending on the country, far exceeding the national prevalence rates. The prevalence ratios are particularly elevated in West and Central Africa as well as in low-prevalence countries.

Young boys and girls in South Africa are both highly affected by intimate partner violence and HIV/AIDS. Research has found links between the two, as well as a relationship with drug use. It was found that problem drinking and cannabis use are mediating variables in the relationship between men who experienced childhood sexual abuse and who engage in HIV sexual risk behaviors.

One 2006 study also noted that alcohol and increased HIV risk are linked to gender-based violence in two specific ways: one being that the consumption of alcohol might lead to increased sexual violence against women who refuse sex, and that women may be abused for disclosing their positive status to their partner.

In adult and adolescent women, low relationship power and victimization by intimate partner violence were found to be linked to HIV risk. This lower relationship power affects interpersonal dynamics that increase sexual risk due to condom nonuse and the likelihood of a girl with low relationship power having more sexual partners.

However, both boys and girls with lower relationship power were more likely to have multiple partners. Regardless of gender, youths with lower power are more vulnerable to being pressured or coerced into transactional sex. Furthermore, women and men both experience difficulty disclosing their HIV positive status for various reasons, the most common of which being that women fear abandonment or retaliative violence, while men fear embarrassment and shame.

=== By pregnant women ===
HIV prevalence among pregnant women is highest in the populous KwaZulu-Natal province (37%), and lowest in the Western Cape (13%), Northern Cape (16%), and Limpopo (18%) provinces. In the five other provinces (Eastern Cape, Free State, Gauteng, Mpumalanga, and North West), at least 26% of women attending antenatal clinics in 2006 tested HIV-positive.

The latest HIV data collected at antenatal clinics suggest that HIV infection levels might be levelling off, with HIV prevalence in pregnant women at 30% in 2007, 29% in 2006, and 28% in 2005. The decrease in the percentage of young pregnant women (15–24 years) found to be infected with HIV can be extrapolated to suggest a possible decline in the annual number of new infections.

=== By age ===
Between 2005 and 2008, the number of older teenagers with HIV/AIDS nearly halved. Between 2002 and 2008, prevalence among South Africans over 20 years old increased. The figure for those under 20 years old dropped somewhat over the same period.

Condom use is highest among the youth and lowest among older people. More than 80% of men and more than 70% of women under 25 years old use condoms, and slightly more than half of men and women aged 25–49 claim to use condoms.

More than 30% of young adults and more than 80% of older adults are aware of the dangers posed by HIV/AIDS. Knowledge about HIV/AIDS is lowest among people older than 50 years—less than two-thirds know exactly what HIV/AIDS is.

=== By province ===
In 2008, more than half (55%) of all South Africans infected with HIV resided in the KwaZulu-Natal and Gauteng provinces.

Between 2005 and 2008, the total number of people infected with HIV/AIDS increased in all of South Africa's provinces except KwaZulu-Natal and Gauteng. Nevertheless, KwaZulu-Natal still has the highest infection rate at 15.5%. In the province with the lowest infection rate, the Western Cape, the total number of people with HIV/AIDS doubled between 2005 and 2008.

Condom use has increased twofold in all provinces between 2002 and 2008. The two provinces with the lowest condom use in 2002 were also the provinces with the lowest condom use in 2008, namely the Northern Cape and the Western Cape.

As of 2019, HIV/AIDS prevalence among South African adults ages 15 to 49 by province are:

- KwaZulu-Natal: 27.0%
- Mpumalanga: 22.8%
- Free State: 25.5%
- North West: 22.7%
- Gauteng: 17.6%
- Eastern Cape: 25.2%
- Limpopo: 17.2%
- Northern Cape: 13.9%
- Western Cape: 12.6%

== Awareness campaigns ==
The four main HIV/AIDS awareness campaigns in South Africa are Khomanani (funded by the government), LoveLife (primarily privately funded), Soul City (a television drama for adults) and Soul Buddyz (a television series for teenagers).

The dubious quality of the condoms distributed is a setback to these efforts. In 2007, the government recalled more than 20 million locally manufactured condoms due to defects. Some of the contraceptive devices given away at the ANC's centenary celebrations in 2012 failed a water test conducted by the Treatment Action Campaign.

== Co-infection with tuberculosis ==
In 2007, it was estimated that one-third of HIV infected people would develop TB (tuberculosis) in their lifetimes. In 2006, 40% of TB patients were tested for HIV. It has been the government policy since 2002 to cross-check all new cases of TB for HIV infection.

Although STI prevention is part of the government's HIV/AIDS programmes, as is that of most countries, in South Africa, HIV/AIDS prevention is done in conjunction with TB prevention. Tuberculosis remains the leading cause of death among people living with HIV in South Africa, and most patients who die from HIV-related causes die from TB or similar opportunistic infections. In fact, the Health Department's prevention program is called the “National HIV and AIDS and TB Programme”. In line with United Nations requirements, South Africa has also drawn up an "HIV & AIDS and STI Strategic Plan".

== History ==
In 1983, AIDS was diagnosed for the first time in two patients in South Africa. The first recorded AIDS-related death occurred in the same year.

=== 1990s ===
In 1990, the first national antenatal survey to test for HIV found that 0.8% of pregnant women were HIV-positive. It was estimated that there were between 74,000 and 6,500,135 people in South Africa living with HIV.

In 1993, the HIV prevalence rate among pregnant women was 4.3%. By 1993, the National Health Department reported that the number of recorded HIV infections had increased by 60% in the previous two years, and the number was expected to double in 1993.

In August 1995, the Department of Health awarded a R14.27-million contract to produce a sequel to the musical, Sarafina!, about AIDS, to reach young people. The project was dogged by controversy and was finally shelved in 1996.

From 6 to 10 March 1995, the 7th International Conference for People Living with HIV and AIDS was held in Cape Town, South Africa. The conference was opened by then-Deputy President Thabo Mbeki.

In January 1996, it was decided that South Africa's national soccer team, Bafana Bafana, would contribute to the AIDS Awareness Campaign by wearing red ribbons to all their public appearances during the Africa Nations Cup.

On 5 July 1996, South Africa's Health Minister, Nkosazana Dlamini-Zuma, spoke at the 11th International Conference on AIDS in Vancouver. She said:

Most people infected with HIV live in Africa, where therapies involving combinations of expensive [antiretroviral] drugs are out of the question.

In February 1997, the South African government's Health Department defended its support for the controversial AIDS drug Virodene by stating that "the 'cocktails' that are available [for the treatment of HIV/AIDS] are way beyond the means of most patients [even from developed countries]". Parliament had previously launched an investigation into the procedural soundness of the clinical trials for the drug.

In 1999, the South African HIV prevention campaign LoveLife was founded.

=== 2000s ===
In 2000, the Department of Health outlined a five-year plan to combat AIDS, HIV, and STIs. A National AIDS Council (SANAC) was set up to oversee these developments.

The South African government successfully defended against a legal action brought by transnational pharmaceutical companies in April 2001, challenging a law that would allow the importation of cheaper, locally produced medicines, including anti-retrovirals. However, the government's rollout of anti-retrovirals remained generally slow.

Also in 2001, Right to Care, an NGO dedicated to the prevention and treatment of HIV and associated diseases, was founded. Using USAID's PEPFAR funding, the organisation expanded rapidly and after ten years (2011) had over 125,000 HIV-positive patients in clinical care.

In 2002, South Africa's Constitutional Court ordered the government to remove restrictions on the drug nevirapine and make it available to pregnant women in all state hospitals and clinics to help prevent mother-to-child transmission of HIV, following a court challenge by Treatment Action Campaign and others.

In 2007, Anand Reddi and colleagues at the PEPFAR funded Sinikithemba HIV/AIDS clinic at McCord Zulu Hospital in KwaZulu-Natal, South Africa published the first report demonstrating paediatric antiretroviral therapy can be effective despite the challenges of a resource-limited setting. Notably, the model at Sinikithemba HIV/AIDS clinic demonstrated the benefits of a family centred model of care and data suggests that an HIV-positive primary caregiver was found to be protective against paediatric mortality.

=== 2020s ===
In 2025, President of the United States, Donald Trump, cut foreign aid funding to numerous countries, directly impacting a major HIV research project in South Africa

In July 2025, South Africa secured R 520 million (approximately USD 29 million) in funding from The Global Fund to Fight AIDS, Tuberculosis and Malaria. The funding will be used to purchase the six-monthly anti-HIV injection, lenacapavir, manufactured by Gilead Sciences. Research has shown that lenacapavir, an antiretroviral medication, could work towards ending HIV/AIDS in South Africa.

== Demographics ==
According to the National HIV and Syphilis Antenatal Sero-prevalence Survey of 2005 and 2007, the percentage of pregnant women with HIV per year was as follows:

Year:	1990	1991	1992	1993	1994	1995	1996	1997	1998	1999	2000	2001	2002	2003	2004	2005	2006	2007	2008	2009	2010	2011
Percentage:	0.7	1.7	2.2	4.0	7.6	10.4	14.2	17.0	22.8	22.4	24.5	24.8	26.5	27.9	29.5	30.2	29.1	28.0	29.3	29.4	30.2	29.5

According to a 2006 study by the South African Department of Health, 13.3% of 9,950 Africans who were included in the poll had HIV. Out of 1,173 whites, 0.6% had HIV. These numbers are confirmed in a 2008 study by the Human Sciences Research Council that found a 13.6% infection rate among Africans, 1.7% among Coloureds, 0.3% among Indians, and 0.3% among Whites.

In 2007, it was estimated that between 4.9 and 6.6 million of South Africa's 48 million people of all ages were infected with HIV, which is the virus that causes AIDS.

== AIDS denialism under Thabo Mbeki ==
=== 2000 ===
On 9 July 2000, then President Thabo Mbeki opened the XIII International AIDS Conference in Durban with a speech not about HIV or AIDS but about extreme poverty in Africa. In the speech, he confirmed his belief that immune deficiency is a big problem in Africa, but that one can't possibly attribute all immune deficiency-related diseases to a single virus.

On 4 September 2000, Thabo Mbeki acknowledged during an interview with Time magazine (South African edition) that HIV can cause AIDS but confirmed his opinion that HIV should not be regarded as the sole cause of immune deficiency. He said:

the notion that immune deficiency is only acquired from a single virus cannot be sustained. Once you say immune deficiency is acquired from that virus, your response will be antiretroviral drugs. But if you accept that there can be a variety of reasons ... then you can have a more comprehensive treatment response.

On 20 September 2000, then-President Thabo Mbeki responded to a question in Parliament regarding his views. He said:

All HIV/AIDS programmes of this government are based on the thesis that HIV causes AIDS. [But ...] can a virus cause a syndrome? ... It can't, because a syndrome is a group of diseases resulting from acquired immune deficiency. Indeed, HIV contributes [to the collapse of the immune system], but other things contribute as well.

=== 2001 ===
In 2001, the government appointed a panel of scientists, including several AIDS denialists, to report back on the issue. The report suggested alternative treatments for HIV/AIDS, but the South African government responded that unless alternative scientific proof is obtained, it will continue to base its policy on the idea that the cause of AIDS is HIV.

=== 2003 ===
Despite international drug companies offering free or cheap antiretroviral drugs, the Health Ministry remained hesitant about providing treatment for people living with HIV. Only in November 2003 did the government approve a plan to make antiretroviral treatment publicly available. Before 2003, South Africans with HIV who used the public sector health system could get treatment for opportunistic infections but could not get anti-retrovirals.

=== 2006 ===
The effort to improve treatment of HIV/AIDS was damaged by the attitude of many figures in the government, including President Mbeki. The then-health minister, Manto Tshabalala-Msimang, advocated a diet of garlic, olive oil, and lemon to cure the disease. Although many scientists and political figures called for her removal, she was not removed from office until Mbeki himself was removed from office. These policies led to the deaths of over 300,000 South Africans.

=== 2007 ===
In August 2007, President Mbeki and Health Minister Tshabalala-Msimang dismissed Deputy Health Minister Nozizwe Madlala-Routledge. Madlala-Routledge has been widely credited by medical professionals and AIDS activists. Although she was officially dismissed for corruption, it was widely held that she was dismissed for her more mainstream beliefs about AIDS and its relation with HIV.

== Role of the media in South Africa's epidemic ==
The South African press took a strong advocacy position during the denialism era under Thabo Mbeki. There are numerous examples of journalists taking the government to task for policy positions and public statements that were seen as irresponsible.

Some of these examples include: attacks on Health Minister Manto Tshabalala-Msimang's "garlic and potato" approach to treatment, outrage at Mbeki's statement that he never knew anyone who had died of AIDS, and coverage of the humiliating 2006 International AIDS Conference.

It could be claimed that the news media have taken a less aggressive stance since the end of Mbeki's presidency and the death of Tshabalala Msimang. The emergence of Jacob Zuma as party and state leader heralded what the press saw as a new era of AIDS treatment.

A recent study by the HIV/AIDS and the Media Project has shown that the quantity of HIV-related news coverage has declined dramatically from 2002/3 (what could be considered the pinnacle of government AIDS denialism) to the more recent "conflict resolution" phase under Zuma. Perhaps HIV has fallen into the traditional categories of being impersonal, undramatic, "old" news. The number of health journalists has also declined considerably.

== See also ==
- Bigshoes Foundation
- HIV/AIDS in South African townships
- Positive Heroes
- Sexual violence in South Africa
- 46664 (concerts)
- South African folk music and AIDS
- HIV/AIDS in Lesotho
- Health care in South Africa
- HIV/AIDS in Africa

== Other sources ==
- Hamada Y, Getahun H, Tadesse BT, Ford N. HIV-associated tuberculosis. International Journal of STD & AIDS. 2021;32(9):780-790. doi:10.1177/0956462421992257
