= Living Hope =

Living Hope may refer to:

- Living Hope (album), a 2018 album by Phil Wickham
- "Living Hope" (song), a 2018 song by Phil Wickham
- Living Hope, 2014 Christian documentary film about South Africa, produced by Mitchell Galin
- Maranatha Living Hope Academy
- Living Hope, a 2003 album by Sinikithemba Choir
