= Audacious Inquiry =

American health information technology company

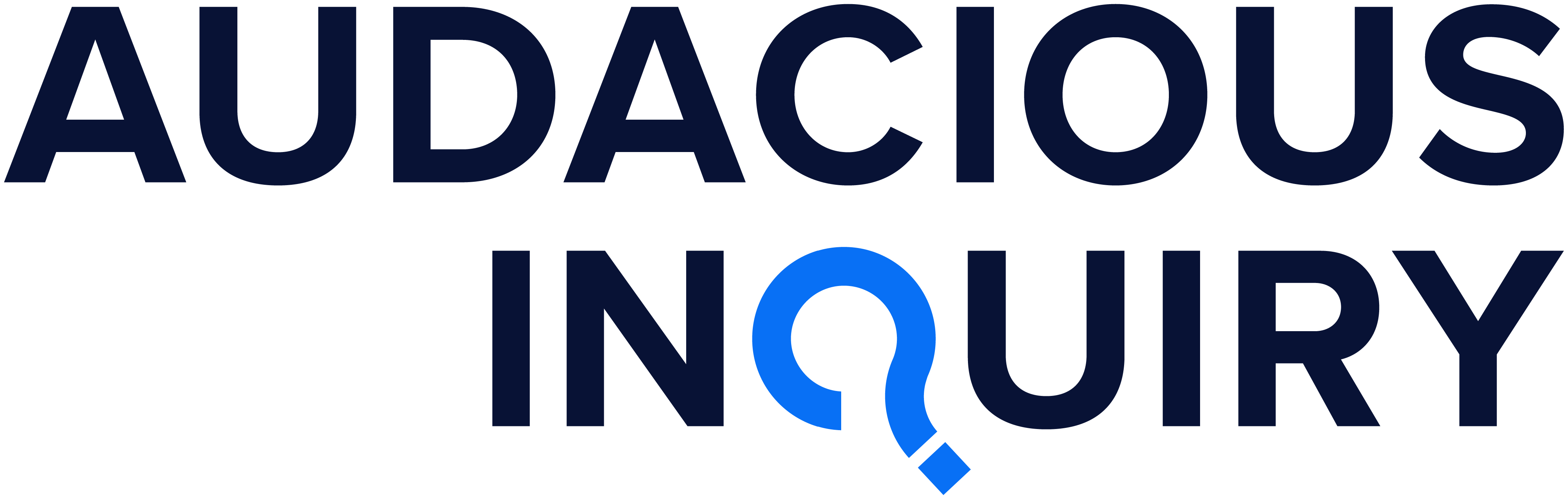
- Industry: Health Information Technology
- Founded: 2004; 22 years ago in the United States
- Headquarters: Baltimore, Maryland, U.S.
- Key people: Scott Afzal, President (2007), Chris Brandt, Founder & CEO (2004)
- Revenue: US$30 million (2020)
- Number of employees: 150 employees (2020)
- Website: www.ainq.com

Audacious Inquiry (Ai) is an American company founded in 2004 and with headquarters in Baltimore, Maryland. The company provides health information technology services and cloud-based software.

== History ==
Audacious Inquiry was founded in 2004 by Chris Brandt, who serves as the company's CEO.

The company endured the Great Recession, which was afflicting major world markets not long after the company was formed. The company graduated from the Maryland Center for Entrepreneurship in 2010 and is now headquartered in the BWtech Research Park on the campus of University of Maryland, Baltimore County.

Audacious Inquiry became a certified B Corporation in 2013. In 2017, it received outside investment from Baltimore-based ABS Capital Partners. Scott Afzal was named President of Audacious Inquiry in 2018. In 2020, the company received additional growth investment from Minneapolis-based TripleTree Capital Partners, ABS Capital Partners, and Frist Cressey Ventures, a Nashville firm cofounded by former U.S. Senator Bill Frist.

In 2018, the company received "hall of fame" recognition from Inc. Magazine; as of 2020, the company has been named to the publication's list of fastest growing companies in America for ten consecutive years.

== Health Information Technology ==
The company provides cloud-based software that allows the exchange of medical and other data across several healthcare organizations. Audacious Inquiry also provides IT consulting and advisory services to support healthcare interoperability and public health.

Beginning in 2007, Audacious Inquiry worked with Johns Hopkins Medicine, University of Maryland Medical System, MedStar Health, Erickson Living, and the Maryland Department of Health to help develop the Chesapeake Regional Information System for our Patients (CRISP), a health information exchange. The firm developed the Encounter Notification Service, an event-driven model for standards-based health information exchange, in collaboration with CRISP. The firm supports or operates similar, "connected healthcare" efforts in several other US states and regions.

The firm developed the Patient Unified Lookup System for Emergencies (PULSE) and worked with the Sequoia Project to make it available as a nationwide disaster response application. In 2017 and 2018, providers used PULSE during the California wildfires. In 2020, PULSE COVID was implemented by public health agencies in several states to support efforts to address the COVID-19 pandemic.

In collaboration with the US Office of the National Coordinator for Health Information Technology and Health Level Seven International in 2020, Audacious Inquiry launched the Situation Awareness for Novel Epidemic Response (SANER) project. The SANER project aimed to establish a technical specification to support public health authorities to assess conditions through electronic communication of information on healthcare capacity, staffing, and availability of key supplies like ventilators and personal protective equipment.
