= Regional Health Information Organization =

A Regional Health Information Organization (RHIO, pronounced rio), also called a Health Information Exchange Organization, is a multistakeholder organization created to facilitate a health information exchange (HIE) – the transfer of healthcare information electronically across organizations – among stakeholders of that region's healthcare system. The ultimate objective is to improve the safety, quality, and efficiency of healthcare as well as access to healthcare through the efficient application of health information technology. RHIOs are also intended to support secondary use of clinical data for research as well as institution/provider quality assessment and improvement. RHIO stakeholders include smaller clinics, hospitals, medical societies, major employers and payers.

RHIOs are intended to be key to the proposed US Nationwide Health Information Network (NHIN).

== Background ==
The US system of healthcare is highly complex and fragmented, with use of multiple information technology systems and vendors incorporating different standards. In contrast with other developed nations, healthcare accounts for a disproportionate percentage of the US GDP, and there is a concern about the economic viability of Medicare. Despite this significant expenditure, there is evidence of inefficiency, waste and medical errors, with a 2001 estimate by the Institute of Medicine of between 44,000-98,000 annual deaths due to medical errors. While numerous possible causes for this situation exist, much waste (e.g., duplication of laboratory tests) and medical errors (e.g., adverse drug reactions) are traceable to inability of healthcare providers (who are not the patients' primary providers) to access patients' existing medical information in a timely manner when needed: better and more ubiquitous health information technology might be part of the overall solution.

In 2004 President George W. Bush issued Executive Order 13335 for the development and nationwide implementation of an interoperable health information technology infrastructure to improve the quality and efficiency of health care with the goal that most Americans will have an EHR by 2014. In July 2004 the United States Department of Health and Human Services released their vision of how America's healthcare system could be rebuilt during the next decade. An aspect of the federal effort is the creation of the Office of the National Coordinator for Health Information Technology. One of the roles of ONC is to facilitate RHIO development.

The planning stage of RHIO formation involves

1. identification of a shared vision/motivation
2. creating a governance structure
3. identifying a technology and network infrastructure for data integration
4. defining standards for data sharing, protection of data, and business practices to ensure patient protection during data exchange
5. defining educational and business strategies to ensure sustainability of the effort.

Finally, RHIOs must implement the proposed strategies.

== Architecture types ==
The two broad types of architecture, centralized and federated, correspond to the data warehouse and federated database system models of data integration. In the centralized configuration (e.g., The Santa Cruz Community and the Michigan UP Network), all providers send their data to the RHIO's central repository on a periodic basis (daily). In the federated model, the RHIO acts as a record locator service, the data stays at its original location, and the RHIO only has a "pointer" to that information.

The pros and cons of each architecture follow from the approaches.

Centralized
For the Centralized design, once data is centralized and restructured into a uniform data model, it is easier to query and analyze. However, because movement and restructuring is generally a complex batch process involving the well-known steps of "extract, transform, load", the centralized data may be somewhat out of date if the (logistically challenging) target of daily updates is not achieved. Also, there may be concerns among the individual RHIO participants who originate the raw data that they are giving up "control" and "ownership" once the data is copied to a central site. Also, creation of the central repository requires close collaboration to determine exactly what data will be centralized and how it will be structured.
Federated
In federated systems the RHIO software only stores information about the locations where a patient's data is available. These are often more politically feasible than centralized systems. However, designing a protocol by which the RHIO can query (heterogeneously structured) individual provider data stores is technically challenging. The software at the individual sites must ensure authenticate electronic requests to ensure that they are legitimate and authorized, and no standards that can be used for this purpose currently exist. A federated setup requires greater network bandwidth than the centralized approach, because a request by a user of the central RHIO software can be farmed out to multiple provider systems.

Centralized and federated approaches are not mutually exclusive, and hybrid setups can be employed. In one proposed hybrid model, the health record trust or health record data bank, all data for each patient would stay in a single repository as in the centralized model, but patients could choose which data bank to use for their records.

== Current status ==
As of 2009, 193 initiatives (including RHIOs) in the United States were working on health information exchange, and 57 of those were actively exchanging data used by healthcare stakeholders. RHIO initiatives exist at two levels, larger (statewide) and smaller (local and rural).

Compared to local RHIOs, state-level initiatives, because of the larger number of stakeholders and patient base, and consequent financial strength, have a greater likelihood of being able to utilize national-level expertise both in health IT and policy-making. Most operational RHIO efforts tend to be larger efforts, though the risk of political battles and consequent failure is also amplified if several large stakeholders choose not to cooperate with each other.

Compared to state-level RHIOs, stakeholders tend to be more heterogeneous with respect to line of business, use of technology and size. Rural RHIOs have a subscriber base of less than 100,000. The presence of numerous, smaller organizations with relatively limited IT budgets translates to numerous challenges due to the dis-economies of small scale. There is limited access to skilled technology professions, and health IT vendors pay less attention to small customers. Many stakeholders continue to deploy legacy software from long-defunct vendors and some may not deploy IT at all. In addition, stakeholders may be less IT-savvy, and even availability of high-speed Internet connectivity may not be assured. A significant sustainability challenge for smaller RHIOs involves funding. Some support models (e.g., used by Northwest, Louisville KY) are based on shared, subscription-based use of commercial health information software, and the shared use of scarce resources such as information technology professionals, who are unaffordable for smaller organizations acting individually.

Irrespective of size, certain challenges remain, such as interoperability standards, as well as consistent standards with respect to privacy, security and appropriate use of the data. Currently, privacy/security issues vary across states, and federal efforts to ensure uniformity are desirable.

== Examples ==
=== INPC and IHIE ===
The Indiana Network for Patient Care (INPC) — originally the Indianapolis Network for Patient Care and Research (INPRC) — operational since 1994, connects all five major hospital systems in greater Indianapolis. All INPC participants now deliver registration records, all laboratory tests, text reports, medication history and all UB92 records (diagnosis, length of stay, and procedure codes) for hospital admissions and emergency room visits to separate electronic medical record vaults in a central INPC server using a federated data store model. The message exchange standard that is used is HL7. The computer system standardizes all clinical data as it arrives at the INPC vault, laboratory, radiology, and other study test results are mapped to a set of common test codes LOINC with standard units of measure, and patients with multiple medical record numbers are linked.

Implementation has been simplified because each participating institution uses the same data model and term dictionary which contain the codes, names (and other attributes) for tests, drugs, coded answers, etc. The data for any participating patient seen in any of the region's 11 emergency rooms can be presented as one virtual medical record. Stakeholders/ participants in this RHIO include: major and regional hospital systems, regional and national reference laboratories, state, federal, and private payors, pharmacy benefit management claims repository services, major physician practice organizations, individual providers, state government (Dept. of Health), major academic research institutions, and others.

The statewide Indiana Health Information Exchange (IHIE), which uses the expertise of the same medical informatics/IT team as the INPC, combines clinical data in combination with administrative (claims) data to support electronic delivery of test reports to physician offices using faxes, printers, and e-mail, as well as Clinical Quality Services, which provide a "report card" (and incentives) on established quality measures to physicians, practice groups, employers, and payers. The IHIE is a rare example of a self-sustaining health information exchange (not reliant on government grants). Stakeholder satisfaction with this RHIO is apparently high.

=== CalRHIO ===
CalRHIO is an example of an RHIO failure due to political/turf battles; it shutdown January 8, 2010. Following heavy competition with California e-Health Collaborative (CAeHC) for designation as California's statewide HIE entity, both organizations were turned down by the state government in December 2009; large stakeholders such as Medicity Inc. and Kaiser Permanente subsequently followed suit and withdrew financial support. Reasons for CalRHIO's failure have been attributed to a limited business model dependent on state-entity designation.

=== Healthcurrent ===
Healthcurrent is the RHIO for the state of Arizona, formerly known as AZHeC. Healthcurrent hosts a physical health and behavioral health/crisis portal for health information exchange throughout Arizona. Healthcurrent links care providers to its standards-based HIE platform and holds a repository of data that is available to be shared with properly accredited care providers in the community. Arizona is an opt-out state for healthcare data flowing to the state HIE.

=== Other examples ===
In some states (e.g., Kansas), an alternative to a stakeholder-consortium-based state-level RHIO is being considered, namely direct involvement of the state governments in creating the RHIO infrastructure. This approach builds on the strengths of state governments as major employers and purchasers of healthcare services (e.g., University of Alabama at Birmingham, is Alabama's largest employer). Similarly, TennCare in Tennessee has roots in addressing the state's un- and under-insured population and is consequently more state driven. Utah's efforts are based on the state's prior efforts to process healthcare claims.

Recent federal efforts (e.g., at the Veterans Administration) are aimed at creating a federal employee based electronic health record system, which might be considered a national RHIO.

== See also ==
- Chesapeake Regional Information System for our Patients (CRISP) — RHIO serving Maryland the District of Columbia
- HealthBridge — RHIO for the Greater Cincinnati area (Ohio, Kentucky, & Indiana)
- Informatics Corporation of America — a RHIO vendor
- PeaceHealth — Medical Group in Alaska, Oregon, & Washington
