= Informatics Corporation of America =

Privately held health information technology organization

- Type: Private
- Industry: Healthcare
- Founded: 2005
- Headquarters: 1801 West End Avenue, Suite 1000, Nashville, Tennessee 37203
- Products: CareAlign
- Number of employees: 103
- Website: icainformatics.com

Informatics Corporation of America (ICA) is a privately held health information technology organization headquartered in Nashville, Tennessee. It serves integrated delivery systems (IDNs), health information exchanges (HIEs), individual hospitals, Independent Practice Associations (IPAs), and Regional Health Information Systems (RHIOs). In 2000, some of Vanderbilt University Medical Center's (VUMC) practicing physicians teamed up with informatics professionals to develop two complementary software applications—dubbed StarChart and StarPanel—to aggregate and organise medical data, and to improve communication and clinical decision-making within a single interface. This technology has allowed VUMC to improve efficiency and communication processes in order to deliver cohesive care across the medical center and its affiliated clinics and physicians' practices.

== History ==
In 2005, VUMC licensed this technology to Informatics Corporation of America and rebranded it as CareAlign, which has become a software provider for data exchange solutions in healthcare. CareAlign provides community information networks, like Health Information Exchanges (HIEs) and Regional Health Information Organizations (RHIOs), the integration and "matching" of structured and unstructured data unique to a patient to form a consolidated, longitudinal, and universal health record.

Additionally, CareAlign has been deployed across the country at IDNs such as Bassett Healthcare in Cooperstown, New York; hospitals such as Lourdes Hospital and its affiliated community physicians in Paducah, Kentucky, at HIEs such as MidSouth eHealth Alliance in Memphis, Tennessee, and the Health Information Exchange Montana and at IPAs such as Cumberland IPA, in the central region of TN.
