= Retirement Living TV =

RLTV
- Country: United States
- Headquarters: Baltimore, Maryland, United States

Programming
- Language: American English
- Picture format: 480i (SDTV); HDTV

Ownership
- Owner: Retirement Living TV, LLC

History
- Launched: September 5, 2006; 19 years ago
- Closed: December 31, 2017; 8 years ago
- Replaced by: Newsy

Links
- Website: www.rl.tv

RLTV (previously known as Retirement Living TV) was an American cable television network.

Launched on September 5, 2006, the channel targeted a demographic aged 50 years and older. Its topics and programs included health and wellness, finance, travel, lifestyle, reinvention, as well as scripted comedy and drama in its cable era. The network was owned by Retirement Living TV, LLC and was based in Baltimore. At its peak, RLTV was available in 29 million homes in the US.

In October 2017, The E. W. Scripps Company purchased RLTV's carriage contracts and replaced RLTV with Newsy.

== History ==
RLTV was founded by John C. Erickson, CEO and Chairman of Erickson Retirement Communities, a privately held company based in Baltimore, Maryland, and founded in 1983. Comcast was an early investor in the network. RLTV hired Gerontologist Alexis Abramson, PhD. and her team of researchers including Dr. Marsha Riggio to hone and support their marketing and programming strategy.

In 2007, RLTV sponsored the Daytona 500 car of 72-year-old James Hylton, and produced the documentary Yellow Mountain Road: The James Hylton Story.

On April 16, 2007, RLTV signed an exclusive distribution agreement with Canadian media company S-VOX. Under the terms of the deal, content from RLTV airs on One and VisionTV. In addition, the two broadcasters co-produced original programming that aired on S-VOX networks.

In 2017, Retirement Living TV, LLC announced the network would wind down operations as a traditional network, a process that ended around December 31 of that year. At the time, it stated that it would continue to produce content, and launch a streaming channel for Apple TV, Roku and Amazon Fire TV the next year. The E. W. Scripps Company purchased RLTV's transponder space and began using the channel space for Newsy, its theretofore online-only news channel. The online version of the network never launched, and as of 2021, the network's website is offline. Newsy itself pursued a new distribution model and ended distribution over the former RLTV space on June 30, 2021. What is now known as Scripps News later ceased broadcasting over-the-air on November 16, 2024 as a reorganizing of Scripps moving the news channel from a digital subchannel network to a streaming-only channel.

== Programming ==
RLTV aired programs hosted by journalist Jean Chatzky, sex therapist and author Dr. Ruth Westheimer, Lea Thompson, and Dr. Kevin Soden. John Palmer and Florence Henderson were both also hosts until their deaths, in 2013 and 2016 respectively.

In 2007, Daily Café launched as a 2-hour, live daily show airing at Noon on weekdays – a current affairs and lifestyle news show hosted by Felicia Taylor, Bobbie Batista, Mary Alice Williams and Sandra Pinckney with live news inserts produced by NBC News. It was produced live out of Reuters Studios in Washington, D.C.

RLTV documented the last on-air footage of Walter Cronkite in the form of a series of editorials known as the "Cronkite Chronicles".
