= Charlene Leonora Smith =

South African journalist

- Born: Charlene Leonora Smith c. 1959
- Citizenship: South Africa
- Occupations: journalist, published author, writing teacher
- Employers: Star; Business Day; ABC's Night line; CBS 60 Minutes; Canadian Broadcasting Corporation; The Washington Post; The Observer; The Guardian; Le Monde; Brain World; Microbicide Quarterly; The Boston Globe
- Notable work: Robben Island; In Celebration of a Great Life; Struik Publishers; Proud of Me: Speaking Out Against Sexual Violence and HIV. Penguin; On the Sidelines Clapping: Gender in Southern Africa; South Africa's top Women. Business in Africa; The Little Book of Big Business Secrets; Committed to Me
- Awards: Woman of the Year: Media and Communications, SABC/Shoprite Checkers 1999; Ruth First Courageous Journalism Award, Rhodes University 2000; Person of the Year, Mail and Guardian newspaper 2000; One of the 10 most Influential South Africans of the Year (ranked fifth), Independent Group of Newspapers 1999; Pretoria Technikon Communicator of the Year 2001; Goddard Alumni Arts Award (2015); Sri Chinmoy Peace Torchbearer Award, Arlington MA (2014)

Charlene Leonora Smith is a South African journalist, published author of 14 books, and is an authorized biographer of Nobel Peace Prize winner, and former South African President, Nelson Mandela. She is a communications and marketing consultant, and writing teacher, who lives and works in the United States.

== Career ==
Smith began her career at the Johannesburg Star, and specialised in anti-apartheid resistance politics. She later reported on South African politics for Sunday Tribune (where she was also deputy bureau chief), Business Day (where she was also deputy news editor), Financial Mail (where she was associate editor) and Finance Week (where she was assistant editor). Smith has worked as a producer for ABC's Nightline (US) with Ted Koppel and for CBS 60 Minutes. She has helped produce television documentaries for Canadian Broadcasting Corporation for many years, including two award-winning documentaries on Nelson Mandela. A documentary on AIDS for the United Nations won the Prix Italia in 2006.

She had a long career as a feature writer for the Los Angeles Times. She has written for The Washington Post, The Observer, The Guardian, Le Monde, Brain World, Microbicide Quarterly, The Boston Globe and other publications. She has lived and worked in Japan, Argentina, South Africa, and the United States where she reported on the White House.

In 1999, she was raped and stabbed in her home and a week later published an account of the event and her quest to obtain antiretroviral drugs. Smith also feared that the rapist may have HIV or AIDS. Smith began campaigning for rape survivors, as she called them, rejecting the term victim, to receive post exposure prophylaxis after rape. She was the first rape survivor in the world to do this. In 2000 she was invited by the Centers for Disease Control to address scientists, as a result of which CDC began research on a protocol for PEP for survivors of sexual assault with her assistance. It was first published in 2004.

In 2004, Smith published an article about the prevalence of rape in South Africa, earning criticism from President Thabo Mbeki, a former friend and ally, and touching off a confrontation in Parliament in which "legislators accused Mr. Mbeki of dodging the issues of sexual violence and AIDS, and the president accused them of pretending that racism died with apartheid." Mbeki's criticisms of her first began in December 1999 when he objected to her reporting about rape and HIV in an address to parliament.

Smith is considered an expert on sexual violence, post traumatic stress syndrome, and HIV. She is regularly invited to present papers and chair sessions at conferences and seminars globally, including the World AIDS Congress. She has twice been an invited guest of the Swedish government and once of the Australian government.

A communications and marketing consultant with considerable expertise in digital media she has consulted to the World Economic Forum, the Summit on Sustainable Development, 2010 FIFA World Cup, Ogilvy PR, South African Airways, HealthBridge, AstroTech Training, Eskom, and others. She has lectured at numerous colleges and universities including the University of the Witwatersrand Graduate School of Journalism; the Antioch Institute at the University of Georgia, Athens; Boston College, Goddard College in Vermont, etc.

She lives and works in Cambridge, Massachusetts.

== Awards ==
- Woman of the Year: Media and Communications, SABC/Shoprite Checkers 1999
- Ruth First Courageous Journalism Award, Rhodes University 2000
- Person of the Year, Mail and Guardian newspaper 2000
- One of the 10 most Influential South Africans of the Year (ranked fifth), Independent Group of Newspapers 1999
- Pretoria Technikon Communicator of the Year 2001
- Features writer, CNN Journalist of the Year 2000
- Woman of the Year, Jong Dames Dinamiek 2002
- Mondi award, Best Feature writer: Health 2003
- Distinguished work media and human rights, SAWA, Toronto, Canada 2005
- Co-recipient Prix Italia, best television documentary – AIDS in South Africa for Synergy Films and United Nations 2006

• Goddard Alumni Arts Award (2015)

• Sri Chinmoy Peace Torchbearer Award, Arlington MA (2014)

== Books ==
- Smith, Charlene (1997). Robben Island. Cape Town: Struik. ISBN 1-86872-062-4. (Revised 2013)
- Smith, Charlene (1999). Mandela: In Celebration of a Great Life. Cape Town: Random House Struik Publishers. ISBN 978-1431700790.(Revised 2012)
- Magubane, Peter (2001). Soweto. Cape Town: Struik Publishers. ISBN 1-86872-584-7. (Text by Charlene Smith)
- Smith, Charlene (2001). Proud of Me: Speaking Out Against Sexual Violence and HIV. Penguin. ISBN 978-0-14-100398-6. (Nominated for the Alan Paton Award, and voted one of the top 10 books of the year by The Star newspaper and Sunday Times. Launched in Sweden as Utan Skuld by Leopard Press in September 2003)
- Smith, Charlene (2006). On the Sidelines Clapping: Gender in Southern Africa. Johannesburg: Heinrich Boll Foundation.
- Smith, Charlene (2006). South Africa's top Women. Business in Africa.
- Smith, Charlene, ed. (2007). The Little Book of Big Business Secrets. AstroTech.
- Smith, Charlene (2009). Committed to Me. Cape Town: Oshun Books. ISBN 978-1-77020-089-0.
- Voyagers into Tomorrow. Tradebridge. 2009.
- Smith, Charlene (2011). Mandela and America. Cape Town, South Africa: David Philip, New Africa Books & Nelson Mandela Foundation. ISBN 978-0864867261.

== Chapters in books ==
- 1992: Patterns of Violence, edited A Minnaar, HSRC, chapter conflict in Natal.
- 1995: Robben Island, edited by Jurgen Schadeberg, the chapter on escapes.
- 2004: How South Africans Looked the Beast in the Eye: HIV in SA, edited by head of SA HIV Clinicians Society, Dr. Des Martin, Jonathan Ball
- 2004: The Closest of Strangers: South African Women’s Life Writing, edited by Judith Lutge Coullie, Wits University Press
- 2005: Media in South Africa, by William Mervin Gumede, Kwa Zulu Natal University Press (chapter on broadcasting)
- 2006: Articulations: A Harold Wolpe Memorial Lecture Collection, Africa World Press and University of KwaZulu Natal Press. 2006: 1956: The Woman’s March, edited and published by Mothobi Mutloatse.
- 2009: AIDS published by Leopard Forlag, Sweden.
- 2017: On Donald Trump, Nelson Mandela, Racism and Making Friends with Your Enemies, Garn Press, New York, USA.
