= Chesapeake Regional Information System for our Patients =

US nonprofit organization

Chesapeake Regional Information System for our Patients (CRISP)
- Type: Nonprofit corporation
- Founded: USA (2009)
- Headquarters: Columbia, Maryland, U.S.
- Revenue: 48,631,747 United States dollar (2022)
- Total assets: 20,760,550 United States dollar (2022)
- Number of employees: 100+ employees
- Website: www.crisphealth.org

The Chesapeake Regional Information System for our Patients (CRISP) is a nonprofit organization created to function as Maryland's state-designated health information exchange (HIE), by the Maryland Health Care Commission. CRISP currently serves as the HIE for Maryland and the District of Columbia. CRISP is advised by a wide range of stakeholders who are responsible for healthcare throughout the region.

Health information exchange allows clinical information to move electronically among disparate health information systems. The goal of the HIE is to deliver the right health information to the right place at the right time – providing safer, timelier, efficient, effective, equitable, patient centered care. In doing so, CRISP offers a suite of tools aimed at improving the facilitation of care for their service region's providers. CRISP was created by Johns Hopkins Medicine, MedStar Health, the University of Maryland Medical System and Erickson Retirement Communities, and receives input from a wide range of sources, including clinicians, hospitals, patients, privacy advocates, payers, and regulators and policymakers.

Audacious Inquiry is one of several contracted service providers and developers that works with CRISP to enable and manage exchange services and initially served as the program director for the effort. Initiate Systems (IBM) and Axolotl Corporation (Ingenix) were selected in 2009 to provide software as a service to enable clinical information exchange via CRISP. CRISP replaced Axolotl with Mirth Results (NextGen) in 2011.

== History ==
In 2006, CRISP began at a Spring meeting between John Erickson and the CIOs of Maryland's three largest hospital systems, asking how to make medical records for seniors available when they visited the hospital. By 2008, CRISP had partnered with MHCC to plan an HIE for Maryland, the processed engaged dozens of healthcare stakeholders. CRISP received $10 million in seed funding through an adjustment in the reimbursement rates for participating hospitals. The Office of the National Coordinator awarded Maryland $9.3 million to implement statewide health information exchange through CRISP. In the 2009 legislative session, Governor Martin O’Malley signed into law House Bill 706, which gives the Maryland Health Care Commission (MHCC) the authority to regulate the state's insurance industry to provide incentives for doctors to connect their practices to CRISP's health information exchange. Maryland's Health IT Extension Center became a reality in 2010 with a grant from the department of Health and Human Services for $5.5 million. Today, CRISP has connected with all of the acute care hospitals in Maryland and DC, and has rolled out several new services, and dozens of new features. CRISP has even expanded their connectivity through partnerships with neighboring HIEs.

== Governance ==
At CRISP's inception, an HIE Policy Board was convened by the MHCC. The board has oversight authority for establishing the policies that govern the statewide HIE. For more information about the Policy Board click here. Additionally, CRISP, in coordination with the MHCC, has developed a governance model that includes a Board of Advisors to provide guidance and input to the CRISP Board of Directors on certain key decisions during the development and operations of the HIE. The Board of Advisors is intended to be broad-based to ensure that a breadth of interested organizations have the opportunity to participate and represent their constituencies. There are currently over 30 organizations represented.

The Board of Advisors is organized into five committees:

Clinical Advisory Board
Committee reviews and provides guidance surrounding CRISP’s plan for exchange service implementations. This includes providing a clinical perspective on CRISP activities, and helping to prioritize HIE service deployments. The committee also assists in gathering information and perspectives from the broader stakeholder community pertaining to HIE services, assists in garnering support and use of HIE services, and assists in assessing the value associated with various CRISP service offerings in terms of clinical relevance and service value in various care settings.
Technology Advisory Board
Committee reviews and comments on the exchange technology request for proposal, participated in the RFP response evaluation and selection process, and provided guidance and expertise on infrastructure and other technology related decisions. Responsibilities also include: providing guidance on network security and data encryption best practices; providing oversight of the performance of technology solutions, once deployed; assessing specific technology solutions surrounding areas such as single sign-on, audit protocols, role-based access, and master patient indexing; and assisting in the development of strategies for integrating end-point.
Finance Advisory Board
Committee reviews and provides guidance on CRISP revenue and pricing models. It is refining and modifying assumptions associated with the CRISP revenue model, evaluating how federal funding requirements impact existing revenue planning, evaluating how federal funding opportunities tie into CRISP financing, and assessing specific HIE services with regards to financial sustainability.
Privacy & Security Advisory Board
The Committee provides guidance on privacy and security issues related to clinical data managed through CRISP and works regularly with the Privacy & Security Officer (PSO) who is responsible for all such matters as they pertain to CRISP’s daily operation. Additionally, the Committee serves as a resource for best practices and recommended policies for HIPAA data security, data use, and data sharing, and provides continual guidance on internal and external HIPAA audits as well as any HIPAA security-related incidents that may occur within CRISP.
Reporting & Analytics Advisory Board
The Committee develops, guides and prioritizes reporting and analytics services designed to support statewide efforts of improving care and reducing costs. Additional Committee responsibilities include assessing the value and relevance of reports for a wide array of users, providing guidance on data tools for report dissemination, such as user guides and other information to enhance understanding of the analysis, and to provide direction and vision in short, mid, and long-term planning of services. CRISP has developed basic reports to support initial hospital needs in monitoring performance on readmission goals.
