= HIV/AIDS in South African townships =

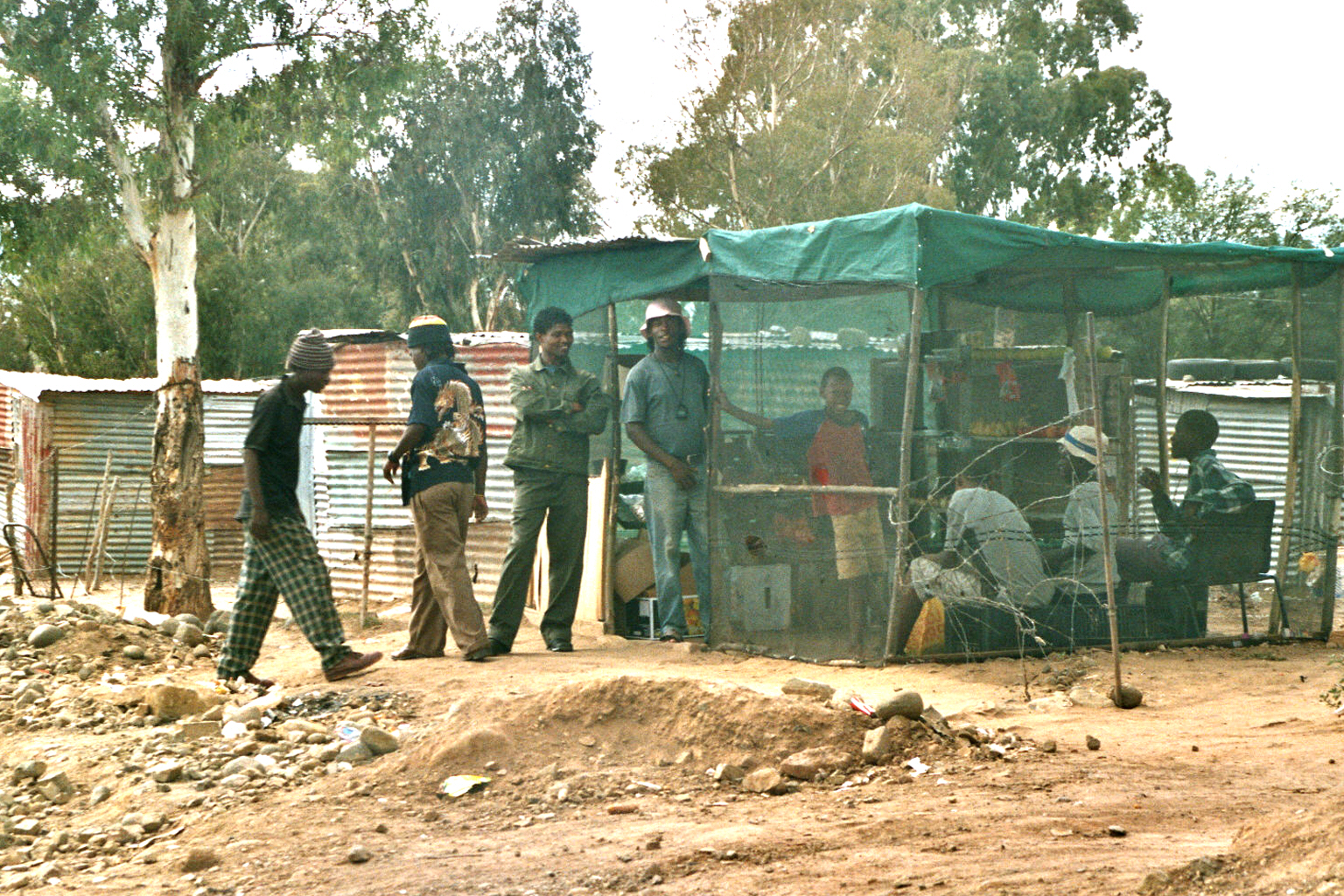
A street shop in Dukatole, one of South Africa's Black townships.

South Africa's HIV/AIDS epidemic, which is among the most severe in the world, is concentrated in its townships, where many black South Africans live due to the lingering effects of the Group Areas Act.

False traditional beliefs about HIV/AIDS, which contribute to the spread of the disease, persist in townships due to the lack of education and awareness programmes in these regions. Sexual violence and local attitudes toward HIV/AIDS have also amplified the epidemic. Although some education efforts and treatment and prevention programmes have succeeded in spreading awareness about HIV/AIDS in townships, the impact of the disease remains severe.

== Prevalence ==
Provinces of South Africa.

In 2008, HIV/AIDS was most prevalent in the South African provinces of KwaZulu-Natal (15.8% HIV-positive), Mpumalanga (15.4% HIV-positive), Free State (12.6% HIV-positive), and North West (11.3% HIV-positive), while only 3.8% of the population was HIV-positive in Western Cape.

A survey conducted in 2010 indicated that HIV/AIDS infection among pregnant women is highest in KwaZulu-Natal (39.5%), Mpumalanga (35.1%), Free State (30.6%), and Gauteng (30.4%).

== Traditional beliefs about HIV/AIDS ==
South Africans in townships are more likely to hold false beliefs about HIV transmission and prevention because they are less likely to have received a formal education or be employed. Many South Africans in townships are unaware of the primary modes of HIV/AIDS transmission: through unprotected sex with an HIV-positive individual, through contact with the blood of an HIV-positive individual, and through mother-to-child transmission from an HIV-positive mother to her baby during pregnancy.

Instead, the traditional beliefs of South Africans in townships have contributed to sexual violence in South Africa and stigmatized HIV-positive individuals, particularly women, thereby increasing the severity of the disease in the region.

=== Stigma ===
HIV/AIDS stigma is widespread in South Africa: a 2002 national survey revealed that 26% of respondents were unwilling to share a meal with a person living with AIDS, 18% were unwilling to sleep in the same room as with someone with AIDS, and 6% were unwilling to talk to a person with AIDS. AIDS-related stigma is most severe among township residents in South Africa because they lack access to reliable information about the disease. Many South Africans in townships wrongly believe that HIV is transmitted through proximity to HIV-positive individuals, which leads them to claim that people with AIDS should be socially ostracized.

In addition, many traditional groups believe that ancestral spirits and supernatural forces punish those who have failed to lead moral lives by infecting them with HIV. According to a study published in 2004, South Africans who attributed HIV/AIDS to spirits and the supernatural were more likely to claim that people with HIV/AIDS were "dirty," "repulsive," "cursed," and "foolish" and should "have restrictions on their freedom," "be isolated," and "feel guilty and ashamed."

Women are particularly vulnerable to HIV/AIDS infection and stigma because they are often economically dependent on men and frequently lack access to education. Men who have the disease may avoid testing and remain anonymous, but women who undergo pre-natal testing are less likely to escape a diagnosis. Because women are often identified as HIV-positive before men, they are branded as the spreaders of the disease and may subsequently face physical abuse and abandonment.

A study conducted in 2010 indicated that the majority of girls in a Cape Town township correlated thinness with disease – in particular, HIV/AIDS. Because of this, women who are slender or experience weight loss also face discrimination. This form of stigma affects women living in townships most severely because rates of malnourishment are higher in townships than in other parts of South Africa.

== Spread of the disease ==
Multiple factors have contributed to the spread of HIV/AIDS in South African townships. Sexual violence in townships, which results partially from cultural norms regarding gender-based power dynamics and partially from psychological desperation, makes women particularly susceptible to HIV/AIDS. Female rates of HIV infection in South Africa are on average five times higher than male infection rates due to biological and social vulnerability.

=== Sexual violence ===
Although many township inhabitants are knowledgeable about HIV/AIDS prevention methods, rates of condom use are still strikingly low. Studies suggest that fear of sexual abuse, which results from unequal power dynamics between men and women in South African townships, is the primary explanation for low condom use rates. Women in Khutsong reported that their relationship would deteriorate if they insisted that their partner use a condom because such a request demonstrates a lack of trust and respect.

Ubuntu, an African philosophy that promotes a spirit of brotherhood between and among community members, explains why township adolescents knowingly spread the disease – they believe that the entire community should share their burden. As a result of this philosophy, HIV-positive fathers will sometimes rape their daughters to guarantee their loyalty and care when their parent's health begins to deteriorate. It is likely that the sense of peer group affiliation that developed among township adolescents during apartheid has contributed to the desire to share the frustration and hopelessness that accompany the disease.

== AIDS orphans ==
An AIDS orphan is defined as "any child under the age of 18 years who had lost one or both parents through an HIV-related illness." Orphanhood is a severe consequence of the AIDS epidemic in South African townships: a 2006 study stated that there were 2.2 million AIDS-orphaned children in South Africa alone. AIDS orphans in an urban Cape Town township have been shown to have significant rates of depression, anxiety, post-traumatic stress, peer relationship difficulties, suicidal urges, delinquency, and homelessness. These rates are higher than those of both non-AIDS orphans and non-orphans in South African townships.

AIDS orphans are particularly vulnerable to poverty, malnutrition, stigma, exploitation, sickness, and sexual abuse, which lead to intense psychological trauma. AIDS orphans are also less likely than non-AIDS orphans and non-orphans to attend and remain enrolled in school due to stigma and an increase in adult responsibilities such as care work and formal or informal employment.

== Education ==
There is currently no law requiring AIDS education in South African schools and government attempts to raise AIDS awareness have largely failed to reach South Africa's underserved townships, where the quality of education is poor. However, there is a clear need for education programmes in South African townships – a survey in Khutsong demonstrated that 70% of the community's young men believed they were not vulnerable to infection.

A 1994 pilot study in an urban Cape Town township demonstrated the potential, but also the limitations, of AIDS education. The study compared AIDS knowledge in two schools, one of which underwent an intensive AIDS awareness programme and one of which did not. Before the programme, students in both schools were misinformed about HIV transmission – many wrongly believed that drinking from an unwashed cup and touching somebody with the disease could transmit the virus.

Few students knew that using condoms, having only one sexual partner, and attending clinics for information and tests can all help prevent HIV/AIDS. Before the implementation of the educational programme, students in both schools also expressed hostility toward HIV-positive individuals – very few indicated that they would welcome an HIV-positive student into their class. They were also likely to underestimate the prevalence and severity of the disease.

Following the completion of the AIDS awareness programme, the students who had participated were more knowledgeable about HIV transmission, prevention, and the course of the disease. However, hostility toward HIV-positive individuals decreased only slightly among the students after the programme and the students did not demonstrate any intention to increase their use of condoms.

== Treatment and prevention ==
Most of South Africa's current anti-HIV/AIDS efforts involve treatment rather than prevention. Although prevention programmes are considered more cost effective, the pervasiveness of the disease has made treatment facilities increasingly important. A 2005 study determined that the introduction of antiretroviral medication, mother-to-child transmission prevention programmes, and Médecins Sans Frontières, or Doctors Without Borders, clinics to Khayelitsha played a role in reducing the impact of the disease.

These programmes have started to confront the HIV/AIDS epidemic in Khayelitsha by making treatment more widely available and providing incentives for HIV testing. Despite these specific successes, treatment has played a limited role in South African townships due to their lack of infrastructure and trained professionals and the high cost of antiretroviral drugs.

HIV/AIDS prevention efforts such as school education, education in the workplace, and mass media campaigns have largely failed to significantly impact South African townships. For example, HIV voluntary counseling and testing programmes have improved HIV/AIDS awareness in Khayelitsha, but have for the most part failed to influence behavior. On the other hand, specific HIV/AIDS prevention methods such as the Priorities for Local AIDS Control Efforts (PLACE) method have demonstrated a potential for success.

A 2003 study used the PLACE method to determine where in townships people meet new sexual partners in order to strategically focus prevention efforts in these locations. These locations included bars, taverns, bottle stores, nightclubs, streets, hotels, and local shebeens. The vast majority of these locations did not provide condoms or information about the transmission of HIV/AIDS. Most patrons visit these sites daily or weekly; therefore, the PLACE method suggests that prevention efforts such as education and social support could be successfully focused on these popular venues.

Churches in South African townships have largely failed to use their social and cultural influence to combat the HIV/AIDS epidemic. Many churches reject HIV-positive members because they are ignorant about the causes of AIDS, have traditional views on sexual morality, or believe that HIV/AIDS is well-deserved punishment for immoral behavior. In addition, many organizations such as the South African Church Leaders Association have only formally acknowledged the severity of the HIV/AIDS epidemic within the last decade.

Despite these large-scale failures, some township churches have become actively engaged in preventing the spread of HIV/AIDS in their communities. Archbishop Desmond Tutu of the Anglican Church in the Western Cape founded the Desmond Tutu HIV Foundation and speaks openly and progressively about the role of education in battling HIV/AIDS. St. Michael's Church in Khayelitsha has supported the efforts of the Millennium Development Goals by founding an HIV/AIDS clinic and orphanage known as Fikelela; this movement has spread to dozens of other Anglican churches in the region.

== Attempts to address the epidemic ==
HIV/AIDS was largely considered a peripheral problem by the South African government and NGOs before the disintegration of apartheid in 1994. However, since then, efforts have been made to address the epidemic with varying levels of success. South Africa's government leaders largely failed to acknowledge the severity of the AIDS epidemic until 2009, which prevented the implementation of successful policy. However, many NGOs have succeeded in targeting South Africa's vulnerable township populations.

=== National government ===
The effectiveness of government-based anti-HIV/AIDS programmes in South African townships was severely reduced by the AIDS denialism of President Thabo Mbeki, who was in office from 14 June 1999 until 24 September 2008, and Manto Tshabalala-Msimang, who served as Health Minister from 25 September 2008 through 10 May 2009. These South African leaders brought the issue of AIDS denialism to the forefront of South African politics by rejecting scientific evidence demonstrating the connection between HIV and AIDS and declaring antiretroviral therapy ineffective.

In 2000, President Mbeki invited nonconformist scientists such as Peter Duesberg and David Rasnick to a Presidential Advisory Panel on AIDS while excluding leading researchers from the convention. President Mbeki's denialism hindered progress in government HIV/AIDS policy by generating skepticism about HIV/AIDS among members of South Africa's Department of Health. This skepticism slowed the implementation of antiretroviral therapy programmes in many of South Africa's townships, particularly in Mpumalanga.

Despite President Mbeki's denialism, the South African government did make efforts to combat the nation's HIV/AIDS crisis while Mbeki was in office. The National AIDS Convention of South Africa (NACOSA) first met in 1992 to design a national AIDS plan to fight the emerging epidemic, which was endorsed by Nkosazana Dlamini-Zuma, South Africa's incoming Minister of Health. However, the plan was largely ineffective because it failed to acknowledge the government's lack of economic resources. The development of the controversial AIDS drug Virodene in South Africa in 1996 reintroduced enthusiasm about HIV/AIDS into the political sphere and led to the successful implementation of several small-scale projects by the national government.

The Khayelitsha District Management Team was established to focus on AIDS from an epidemiological angle and an AIDS programme coordinator was appointed to Khayelitsha to monitor the disease in the township. The government also financed a mother-to-child-transmission programme in Khayelitsha in 1999. However, stigmatization and the government's dismissal of new treatment options continued as Mbeki's denialism campaign intensified in the early 2000s. The government issued the HIV/AIDS/STD Strategic Plan for South Africa 2000-2005 at the urging of the United Nations, but the plan lacked concrete proposals and a timeline and largely neglected the potential of antiretroviral therapy.

Jacob Zuma, South Africa's president as of 9 May 2009, has expanded the national government's HIV/AIDS outreach programmes in an attempt to serve marginalized township populations and the country as a whole. On World AIDS Day on 1 December 2009, President Zuma announced his intention to reverse South Africa's health trends by increasing HIV treatment nationwide. He insisted that HIV-positive children under age one and pregnant women would receive increased attention and treatment in accordance with World Health Organization treatment guidelines. However, the national government remains hindered by the high cost of medication and the nation's unpredictable funding, poor health systems, and widespread stigma, leaving many townships unaided.

=== NGOs ===
NGOs have played a significant role in combating and raising awareness about the HIV/AIDS epidemic in South African townships.

- The Red Cross Society has focused its HIV/AIDS care and awareness efforts in Khayelitsha and Nyanga through home-based initiatives and education programmes in schools.
- The Township AIDS Project (TAP) was established by medical professionals in 1989 in order to spread accurate information about HIV/AIDS to the poor in South Africa's townships.
- Médecins Sans Frontières, or Doctors Without Borders, established an HIV treatment programme in Khayelitsha in 1999 and has provided over 17,650 patients in the township with antiretroviral treatment since 2001.
- Population Services International established the Society for Family Health (SFH) in South Africa in 1992. The SFH's youth outreach programme, YouthAIDS, educates township populations across South Africa about HIV/AIDS transmission.

==== Treatment Action Campaign ====
The Treatment Action Campaign (TAC) was launched in 1998 to "campaign for greater access to treatment for all South Africans, by raising public awareness and understanding about issues surrounding the availability, affordability and use of HIV treatments." The TAC's goals are to "ensure access to affordable and quality treatment for people with HIV/AIDS, prevent and eliminate new HIV infections, improve the affordability and quality of healthcare access for all, and campaign against the view that AIDS is a death sentence."

The TAC has focused its efforts on urban populations in Gauteng and Western Cape, but is continuing to extend its reach to townships and rural areas in South Africa such as Lusikisiki. The TAC is well-established in Mpumalanga and has contributed substantially to the HIV/AIDS campaign in KwaZulu-Natal, which was among the first provinces to provide antiretroviral drugs to HIV-positive pregnant women. In August 2002, the TAC campaigned to have the local clinic in Nyanga open for five days per week rather than two. The TAC distributes over 500,000 condoms in Khayelitsha every month, which helped reduce the incidence of sexually transmitted diseases in the township by 50% between 2004 and 2007. Mortality statistics in Khayelitsha have also improved in recent years, which may be partially due to the TAC's outreach efforts.

== See also ==
- HIV/AIDS in South Africa
- Sexual violence in South Africa
