= Positive Heroes =

Positive Heroes is a South African non-profit organisation which celebrates how people living with HIV can live normal lives. It has Charitable status with the South African Revenue Services (SARS) and is registered as a Non Profit Organisation with the Department of Social Development.

== History ==
"Positive Heroes" was founded by Dr Reon van Dyk and Gavin Reid in 2007 in Cape Town, South Africa. Through its media partnership with Thought24 and Move! magazine the charity publicises inspirational stories about South Africans living with HIV to a growing audience of over 1.85 million across the country. Billboards, news items, radio and TV are all employed to reduce stigma and normalise HIV in a country where an estimated 5.7 million, out of a total population of 48 million, are living with HIV. The ultra-marathon team also helps to change perceptions of what a positive diagnosis mean. The team all completed the 56 km Two Oceans and 89 km Comrades in 2009, 2010 and 2011.

== Mission ==
Positive Heroes' aims are to reduce the fear, misinformation, stigma and discrimination that surround HIV, by raising the profile of South Africans from a wide variety of communities and walks of life who are living positively with HIV, and to encourage people with HIV to manage their HIV and to live "full and rewarding lives".

== Activities ==
Positive Heroes' main activities include the following:

- Providing role models to encourage and inspire others living with and affected by HIV with their powerful and positive stories
- Partnership with Thought24's Move! Magazine, reaching over 1.85 million people with inspirational stories showing how South Africans are responding to the challenge of living with HIV
- An ultra-marathon team, who are all living with HIV, who run South Africa's toughest endurance races including Two Oceans and Comrades
- An annual Unique Fashion Event to raise the profile of HIV stigma and raise funds for the charity
- A series of billboards conveying 'messages of hope' from Our Heroes
- Reinstating the dignity and personal empowerment of those who are living with HIV
- Sensitising and mobilising communities to create a shared vision and commitment to address the current challenges of HIV, especially those of stigma and discrimination
- Raising funds and donations enables the tightly run, focused and imaginative organisation to fulfil its mission.

Positive Heroes started with 12 role models and currently has 24. These are Ana Mdoda, "Andile Gidana", Brett Anderson, Buysisiwe Maqungo, Christo Greyling, David Patient, "Derrick Fine", Evelina Tshabalala, Faghmeda Miller, Funeka Menze, Johanna Ncala, Khuthala Makeleni, Lindelwa Portia, Luckboy Mkhondwane, Masibulele Gcabo, Mziwethu Faku, Nokubonga Yawa, Nomsa Mpehle, Noncedo Gulwa, Quintin Jonck, Terresa Frankenberg, Thembelihle Dlamini-Ngcoya, Vuyiseka Dubula and Zintle Mobbs.

== Awards ==
Positive Heroes won the Nike Gamechangers award in 2009 Positive Heroes wins "Nike Gamechangers competition". In 2011 a mainstream news story broadcast on SABC2 Morning Live and produced by Health-e TV reporter Fathima Simjee won the 2011 Vodacom TV Awards best TV news category in the highly competitive southern and northern region for "Positive Heroes", about HIV positive people who run the Comrades Marathon.

== See also ==
- HIV/AIDS in South Africa
