= Murder of Uyinene Mrwetyana =

2019 South African murder victim

Uyinene Mrwetyana
- Mrwetyana in 2017/18
- Born: Uyinene Mrwetyana; 20 April 2000; East London, Eastern Cape, South Africa
- Disappeared: 24 August 2019 (aged 19); Claremont, Western Cape, South Africa
- Died: 24 August 2019 (aged 19); Claremont, Western Cape, South Africa
- Cause of death: Head injury from bludgeoning
- Body discovered: Lingelethu West, Khayelitsha
- Resting place: Qina Location, Centane, Eastern Cape, South Africa
- Other name: Nene
- Education: Kingswood College
- Alma mater: University of Cape Town
- Occupation: Scholar
- Parent(s): Noma Mrwetyana; Philip Mrwetyana
- Relatives: Esona Mrwetyana (brother)

Uyinene "Nene" Mrwetyana (20 April 2000 – 24 August 2019) was a South African student at the University of Cape Town. On August 24, 2019, she was raped and murdered in the suburb of Claremont, Cape Town. Her murder highlighted the broader national problem of gender based violence and femicide in South Africa, and is credited with "shifting the South African collective consciousness" and "igniting a movement".

== Background ==
Mrwetyana was born in East London, Eastern Cape to parents Noma and Philip Mrwetyana. She grew up in the suburb of Beacon Bay in East London and attended Hudson Park Primary School in Vincent, where she chaired the school's student council and was awarded the "Hudsonian of the Year" award. Mrwetyana attended high school at Kingswood College where she graduated in 2018, posthumously receiving the school's own Neil Aggett Memorial Award in 2020. She began studying film and media at the University of Cape Town soon after graduating high school.

== Incident and legal proceedings ==
=== Murder and disappearance ===
On 24 August 2019, Mrwetyana had been told by a post office attendant and her future killer, Luyanda Botha, that her parcel was not ready for collection and that she should come back later in the afternoon, despite the post office closing at 1 pm. Botha had planned his attack in advance, arranging with his post office colleague, Soraya Abdullah for her to leave work earlier. When Mrwetyana arrived after the official closing time, Botha locked the door behind her and began to violate her. He raped her and attempted to strangle her, before ultimately bludgeoning her to death with a two kilogram weight targeting her head and eventually knocking her unconscious. He returned the following day to retrieve her body and drove to a nearby field where he doused her body with petrol and set it on fire.

Mrwetyana was last seen in Claremont leaving a minibus taxi outside Clareinch Post Office soon before her death. She was missing for nine days and received a large amount of media coverage and public attention in Cape Town. It was during this time that the hashtag #BringNeneHome started trending on social media. Mrwetyana's body was found in a hole beside an unused railway track in the township of Lingelethu West in Khayelitsha. It was discovered on the 26th but was only identified as hers a few days later.

=== Trial ===
A suspect, later identified as post office employee Luyanda Botha, was arrested and confessed to the Wynberg Magistrate's Court of committing the murder at a post office in Claremont. Following his arrest and subsequent confession, Botha was found to have raped and strangled her, before ultimately bludgeoning her to death. On 15 November 2019, Luyanda Botha received three life sentences for the rape and murder of Mrwetyana. He will be eligible for parole after serving 25 years of his sentence.

== Response ==
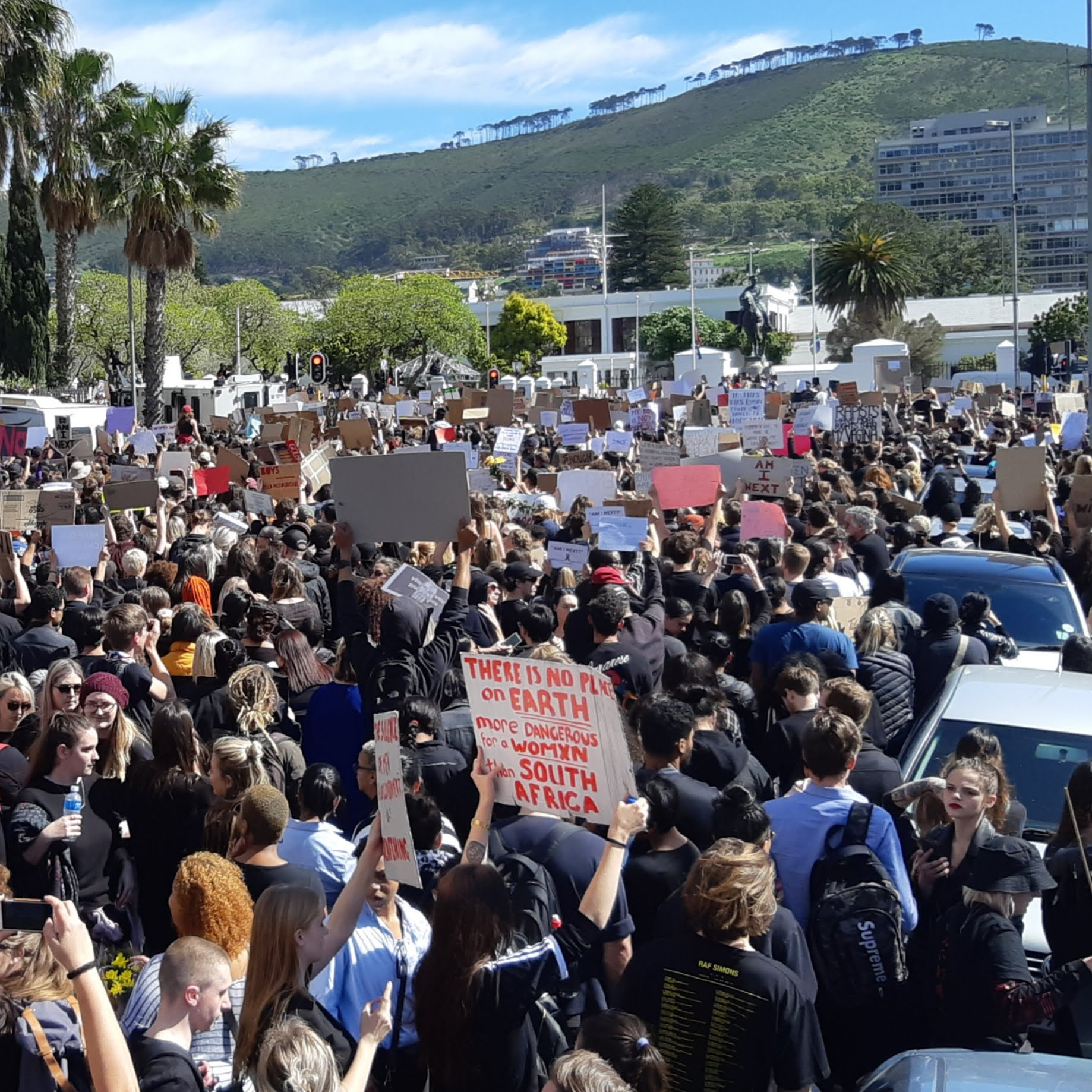
Protests against gender based violence and femicide occurred outside Houses of Parliament after the news of Mrwetyana's death

=== National reactions ===
Following Botha's arrest, remembrances and memorial services were held at the University of Cape Town, and University of Witwatersrand. A large protest occurred at the World Economic Forum on Africa in Cape Town on 4 September where South African President Cyril Ramaphosa was present. Ramaphosa also attended an even larger protest outside Houses of Parliament, Cape Town the next day which gathered an attendance of several thousand people. The hashtag #AmINext gained prominence during this time and was a major motive behind several of the protests. Mrwetyana's death as well as the rape and death of other women precipitated widespread public outcry that led to a two-day campus shutdown at the University of Cape Town. Mrwetyana's death "ignited a movement" and is known to have "shifted the South African collective consciousness".

==== Implementations ====
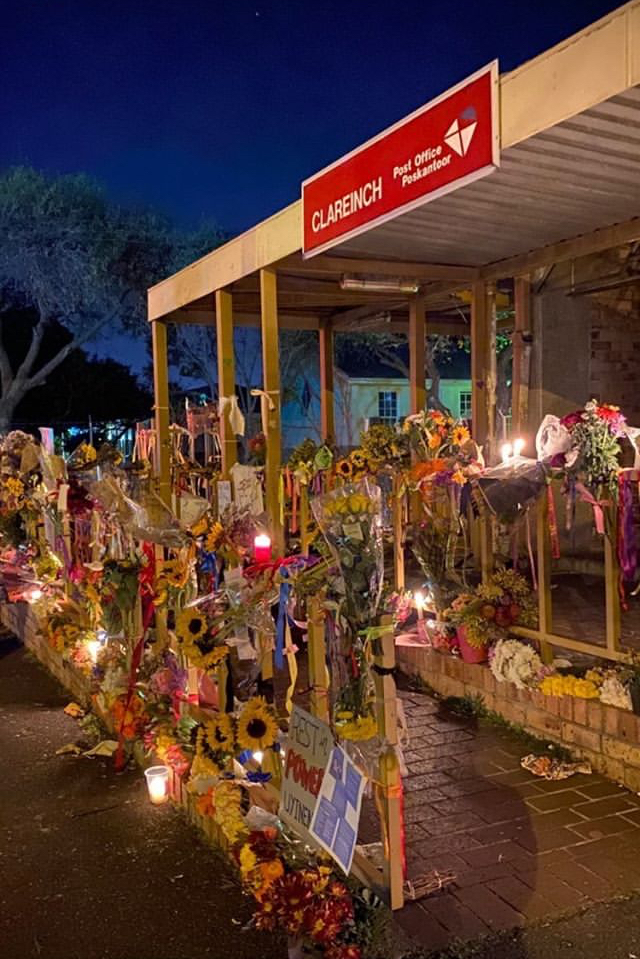
Clareinch Post Office in Claremont on 24 August 2020, a year after Mrwetyana's death

On 29 November 2019, The Uyinene Mrwetyana Foundation was founded in Makhanda, Eastern Cape in celebration of her life. The Uyinene Mrwetyana Scholarship was also founded for female students in the Humanities faculty at the University of Cape Town, and was later first awarded to Luhlanganiso Majebe in July 2021. Following protests and uproar after Mrwetyana's death, President Cyril Ramaphosa announced reforms such as harsher punishments for sex offenders and the public disclosure of the National Register for Sex Offenders to stem sexual and physical violence against women and children.

=== International reactions ===
In September 2019, Meghan, Duchess of Sussex secretly visited the post office where Mrwetyana was murdered, while touring South Africa with her husband, Prince Harry. In that same month, hundreds of South Africans gathered to protest against gender-based violence in Times Square, New York City after the news of Mrwetyana's death.

== See also ==
- Sexual violence in South Africa
- Feminism in South Africa
- Murder of Leigh Matthews
