= South African folk music and AIDS =

South African folk music is a form of activism that raised awareness about the spread of HIV/AIDS serving as a means of protest during the 1990s and 2000s. South African folk music incorporates various instruments ranging from drums, reeds, flutes, stringed instruments, and some other instruments. Across South Africa, folk music was one of the tools used to start discussions about HIV/AIDS. From the 1990s to the early 2000s performance groups were founded across South Africa, which was known as the epicenter of the HIV/AIDS crisis. These types of instruments have been used by indigenous South African people and some performance groups decided to incorporate some of these instruments.

== Local reactions to the AIDS crisis ==
=== Khayelitsha Courthouse Protest 2002 ===
The Khayelitsha Courthouse is located in Cape Town, South Africa, a region with one of the highest reported rates of HIV/AIDS cases. In 2002, there was a court case that was discussing how two women were seeking justice from the Khayelitsha Courthouse when both of them were raped by local pastor Thema Dumisami Mathibela, a figure that was highly respected within the Cape Town community. Some people gathered to protest and along with the protests the demonstrators also collaborated with the Treatment Action Campaign.

There were some instances where patients who tested positive for HIV/AIDS were also survivors of rape and sexual assault. People gathered to protest the need for safe sex practices and education about HIV/AIDS. During the demonstrations, they let music groups and individuals perform and demonstrators distributed free condoms out to the crowds of people that had gathered. The protests also included public health educators to promote safe sex practices and HIV/AIDS resources. The songs that were performed during this demonstration were about safe sex practices and the experiences of living with HIV/AIDS and some of the songs had even included messages about wearing condoms. However, controversy surrounding these demonstrations and protest songs came primarily from the older adult population who resisted the HIV/AIDS awareness campaign. In some parts of the country, there was denialism about HIV/AIDS. While some people were supportive of bringing awareness, others were not. Some people were not supportive of the awareness campaigns because of the ambiguity of treatment methods that could be used to help treat HIV/AIDS. During the 1990s and early 2000s, some people believed that HIV/AIDS could be treated as communicable diseases with traditional therapy methods, while others in the awareness campaigns believed that biomedical therapy would be more effective as treatment.

=== Venda peer educators post Apartheid ===
Venda is another city that is located in South Africa where people were affected by HIV/AIDS. After Apartheid was abolished across South Africa, some people got together to become peer educators to bring awareness to HIV/AIDS. However, one difference with these peer educators was that they brought awareness through song form instead of through presentations or seminars. They performed a number of pieces, some of them being called "Hey Wena Gatsha" and "Diraga," which both mentioned the HIV/AIDS crisis through a religious lens. While some of the songs had directly referred to the experiences that HIV/AIDS patients were going through, there were other songs that discussed the controversies surrounding the crisis. There were some ethnomusicologists that were interested in looking at the methods that these peer educators had used, one of them being ethnomusicologist John Blacking.

== Performance groups and artists involved ==
=== The Songs of Madosini ===
The songs of Madosini were performed by the artist Latozi Mphalemi who went by Madosini while she performed, and these songs were part of the folk music genre but she also incorporated European instruments into her music. One of the instruments that Madosini's music incorporated was called a mouthbow. One of the unique things about this instrument is the ability to incorporate a whistle note, which is a high pitched note that's used as part of a musical harmonic progression that make up numerous patterns of different chords and notes. The music was known for its ability to incorporate a musical expression known as a glissando, which allows one to glide smoothly from one note to the next. These musical tactics were used in some of Madosini's songs, one example being a song called "UTsiki." The music investigated the heritage of the Mpondomise people, a tribe that resided in parts of South Africa, and some of these songs also focused on social justice movements.

==== Music styles and group controversies ====
The songs of Madosini and some other folk music sometimes discussed the Apartheid movement. This post Apartheid period happened starting in 1994 and was known as the African Renaissance. Madosini's songs emerged when cases of HIV/AIDS were on the rise in South Africa after Apartheid, while some of her other songs had talked about preserving the Xhosa people's identity. One of the songs that were performed discussing HIV/AIDS was called "Yaka Yaka" which talked about subjects including, but not limited to identity.

=== The Siphithemba Choir Group ===
The Siphithemba Choir Group is a group that was founded in 1997 in Durban, South Africa by the McCord Mission Hospital. Their name, particularly the root word "-ithemba" translates to the word "hope" in English and its meaning originates from the Xhosa tribe.

For some background about the practice, the McCord Hospital was founded by Dr. James McCord who was a missionary of the American Congregational Church in 1909. The choral group was later involved in providing a mental health resource for HIV/AIDS patients at the McCord Mission Hospital when about 70% of the patients receiving care were HIV/AIDS positive.

Siphithemba's music focused on folk music originating from the Zulu tribe that resided in South Africa during the colonial era as well as gospel music with an emphasis on Christian beliefs. The type of folk music genre that they had done the most in their performances was called Maskanda which was a type of folk music that was performed by the Zulu tribe. The Siphithemba Choir even rearranged some of the songs done by the artist Enoch Sontonga and even composed some of their own music and their songs had specialized in a call and response format where soloists and performers were allowed to improvise on some pieces of the music. The Siphithemba Choir had performed at the Zimbalwi Lodge, which is located in Durban on July 29, 2007 where the McCord Mission Hospital had organized a cocktail party and invited the group to come and perform for them. They had decided to perform at this location because there was an influential HIV/AIDS research expert who was a professor at Harvard University named Bruce Walker. The Siphithemba Choir performed two Zulu tribe songs called "Isiyalo" and "Ikhalaphi," and in English the songs titles mean "Advice" and "From Whence the Cry."

==== Music style and group controversies ====
Whenever the music group had performed in South Africa they used drums in their music pieces. However, when the choir was invited to perform at the Conference for Retroviruses and Opportunistic Infections in Boston, the event would not allow them to perform with their drums. This controversy led to interviews with the McCord Hospital. The Siphithemba Choir decided to incorporate drums into some of their pieces because it allowed for a more spiritual aspect of their music. However, to some people the drum was believed to have represented a form of grassroots education, where some believed that it went against the religious values of the McCord Mission Hospital.

=== The Thembeka Choir Group ===
The Thembeka Choir, founded in the early 2000s, performed in Durban and all its singers were diagnosed with HIV/AIDS, and they participated in fundraising and community events to raise awareness about the epidemic. The choir had also focused on some pieces of gospel music and they also incorporated dancing and drums, which were traditional to the Zulu tribe. Thembeka ended up touring all across the globe and contributed to fundraisers that helped South African hospitals treat people with HIV/AIDS.

Before the group was founded some of the choir members were raised in Ulmazi right when Apartheid and segregation had ended. Throughout some of the members childhood, they grew up singing and performing with each other and even received opportunities to perform at the Durban Hospital AIDS clinic. At the clinics, the choir members were involved in working with HIV/AIDS patients ranging from bead working to support group circles where experiences were shared. The group was formed when HIV/AIDS cases were on the rise after Apartheid was abolished. The year 1982 is when some of the first cases of HIV/AIDS were reported in South Africa and that number continued to climb even into the early 1990s and 2000s.

Some of the songs that they had performed had an emphasis on religious beliefs that were indirectly linked to discussions about HIV/AIDS. Some of their songs had religious references to Christian figures such as Jesus Christ. Choir members had even written some of their own music for the group that would later be performed at events.

==== Music style and group controversies ====
The Thembeka Choir did however face backlash as this group focused on bringing awareness to HIV/AIDS through moral and ethical perspectives. Just before the 1990s, Apartheid had ended in South Africa. The choir's music was judged based on the way that their pieces were performed and there were a few instances where the Thembeka Choir was told that they weren't allowed to bring their instruments onto the stage. When the choir performed in United States, they weren't allowed to use any of their instruments such as their drums. They also weren't permitted to do their choreography during their numbers.

=== The Sinikithemba Peer Support Group ===
The Sinikithemba Peer Support Group was founded in 1997 by the McCord Mission Hospital and later became a choir that was known as the Sinikithemba Choir. The peer support group was also known as the Sinikithemba AIDS Clinic and the meetings would take place at a building called House 35 which was part of the property at the McCord Mission Hospital and was later renamed the Hope House. During the support group sessions, the singers and hospital staff would lead patients through prayers and other exercises. At the McCord Mission Hospital they gave these treatment options to patients before and after they were diagnosed with HIV/AIDS. They also provided hospice care to patients and sometimes included the patient's family members during the support group sessions.

==== Music style and group controversies ====
During the 1990s and early 2000s, there were some people that lost their jobs whenever their HIV/AIDS test results were made public in their place of work. Sometimes, the group was seen as controversial for advocating for HIV/AIDS patients to be included back into the work industry. On top of leading patients through prayers, the other exercises included many types of artwork such as bead making, which was incorporated into a finances unit that the support group had conducted. These pieces of art were sometimes sold to give patients some sort of sustainable income.

== Notable people ==
=== Phumulani Kunene ===
Phumulani Kunene was the director of the Siphithemba Choir and along with the conductor Xolani Zulu, Kunene decided to incorporate dance into the numbers that they wanted to perform. During the performances, Kunene let audience members join them on stage and dance along with the choir. Kunene and the conductor led rehearsals in Durban, where the choir would listen to a CD player and start rehearsing their songs. The director had even collaborated with Tim Janis, who was the director of the Sinikithemba Choir and together, the two choirs performed a song called "A Thousand Summers," which was eventually recorded for audiences around the world to hear. Kunene did further collaborations with the Sinikithemba Choir and other members of the music industry. Eventually, he went on to help film the movies iThemba-Hope, which was released in 2004 and Raising Their Voices: The Sinikithemba Choir, which was released one year later.

=== Mrs. Nonhlanhla Mhlongo ===
Mrs. Nonhlanhla Mhlongo is a medical social worker for the McCord Mission Hospital that helped treat patients with HIV/AIDS, and she eventually founded the Sinikithemba Support Group, which became known as the Sinikithemba Choir. Mrs. Mhlongo studied at the University of Zululand from 1975 to 1980 where she received training to become a social worker. In college, she participated in the Black Consciousness Movement and after college she was hired by the McCord Mission Hospital. Her mission while working for the hospital was to create the Sinikithemba Peer Support Group and she eventually founded the Sinikithemba Choir with the help of Tim Janis.

=== Latozi Mphalemi (Madosini) ===
Latozi Mphalemi or Madosini, which was her performance name, was an Mpondomise musician that participated in composing music that was later released to the public and used in some films and documentaries. Her songs included musicians that knew how to play tribal music with European instruments that emphasized traditional South African culture. Also, her music incorporated traditional South African instruments that had some call and response elements implemented into them. Madosini typically used an instrument called a mouthbow which is similar to a flute that is used in more Western modes of music. The artist played this instrument to experiment with different types of melodies and the sheet music that she would read from was traditional sheet music that contained the treble clef and base clef.
