= LoveLife South Africa =

South African non-profit organization

loveLife
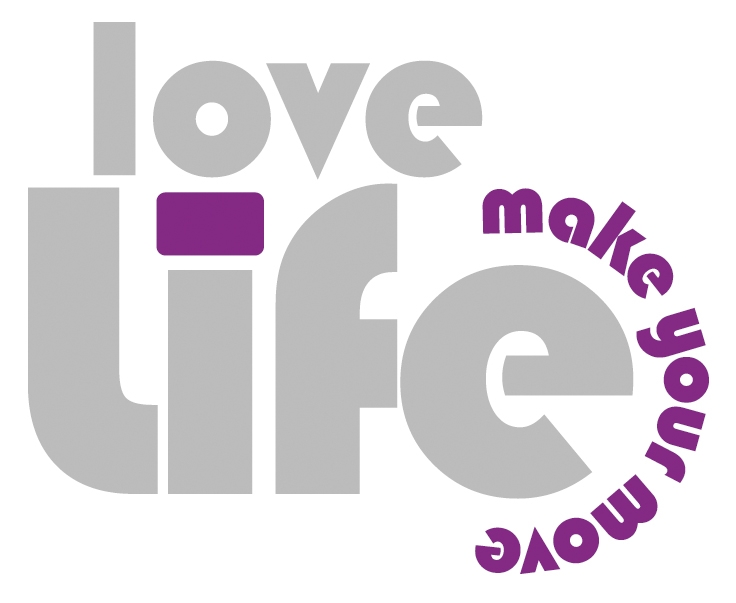
- Founded: 1999; Johannesburg, Gauteng, South Africa
- Type: Non-profit organization
- Purpose: HIV, AIDS, Youth
- Location: Johannesburg, South Africa (national)
- Region served: nationwide South Africa
- Method: peer educators, education, media
- Key people: Grace Matlhape, Chief Executive Officer
- Website: www.lovelife.org.za www.mymsta.mobi

loveLife is a youth focused HIV prevention initiative in South Africa.

The overall aim of loveLife is to reduce the rate of new infections in young people, in order to reduce the overall prevalence of HIV in South Africa, which stands at 10.9% (2008) of the population. (Additional sources: UNAIDS, HSRC, see also HIV/AIDS in South Africa) Considering that a high number of new infections are among 15- to 24-year-olds,

While loveLife's national office is situated in Johannesburg, there are provincial offices in each of South Africa's nine province plus more than 20 regional offices nationwide. loveLife's 18 Y-centres are set up in areas of high HIV prevalence.

== Partners ==
loveLife was launched in late 1999 as a joint initiative of leading South African non-government organisations and the South African government, in partnership with several private foundations and private sector support. Amongst others the Henry J Kaiser family Foundation has been a lead funder and driver of the organisation. Primary funders in 2010 include the South African Department of Health, the Department of Social Development and Sports and Recreation South Africa. Additional funding and support is provided by South Africa's corporate sector including Barloworld, Murray & Roberts, Independent Newspapers, Rapport, the National Lottery Distribution Trust Fund (NLDTF), the South African Broadcasting Corporation, Ster-Kinekor, VW and Anglo American. Large donors such as DfiD, the Henry J Kaiser Family Foundation, UNFPA and the Bill and Melinda Gates Foundation have also supported loveLife.

Since 2008, loveLife has received technical support from DED, the German Development Service (from 2011 on GIZ, Gesellschaft fuer Internationale Zusammenarbeit), with several advisors, volunteers and private public partnership funds

== Results ==
In 2006, the World Health Organisation (WHO) recognised loveLife as the only national programme in the world that did measure HIV prevalence. WHO found: "Strong evidence for improvements in participation in HIV testing, interpersonal communication about HIV and decreases in HIV infection rates."

HIV prevalence has declined among children aged 2–14, from 5.6% in 2002 to 2.5% in 2008; and among youth aged 15–24 from 10.3% in 2005 to 8.6% in 2008 – indicating that HIV prevention campaigns and behaviour change programmes are making a dent in the epidemic. The survey also reveals that loveLife has high reach into the youth age ranges, with the organisation reaching 79.1% of youth aged 15–24 in 2008.

The challenges that have to be faced when evaluating a national HIV prevention strategy as loveLife is described in Pettifor et al. 2007.
