= Sexual violence in South Africa =

South Africa

The rate of sexual violence in South Africa is among the highest recorded in the world. Police statistics of reported rapes as a per capita figure have been dropping in recent years, although the reasons for the drop have not been analysed, and it is not known how many rapes go unreported. More women are attacked than men, and children have also been targeted. Rape victims are at high risk of contracting HIV/AIDS owing to the high prevalence of the disease in South Africa. "Corrective rape" is also perpetrated against LGBT men and women.

The South African Government has established several measures, including legislation and initiatives, to prevent and combat the problem. These include the establishment of the Sexual Offences and Community Affairs Unit (SOCA) in 1999 and the network of Thuthuzela Care Centres. These are sexual violence support centres which employ a transdisciplinary approach to dealing with the aftermath of an assault, and are considered by the UN as a best practice model.

Sexual violence in South Africa has been widely reported in both local and international media.

== Statistics ==
=== Official police statistics ===
South Africa's Police Service (SAPS) releases the country's crime statistics. The crime category "sexual offences" includes a wide range of sexual offences, including rape, sexual assault, incest, bestiality, flashing, and other crimes. SAPS releases statistics on reported rapes every quarter, as well as an annual report (financial year, April thru March each year). The figures in the following table include reported rapes only.

Number of reported rapes and rape rate in South Africa
Year	Reported Rapes	Reported Rape Rate per 100,000
2008/9	46,647	95
2009/10	48,259	96
2010/11	48,158	95
2011/12	47,069	91
2012/13	48,408	92
2013/14	45,349	85
2014/15	43,195	80
2015/16	41,503	77
2016/17	39,828	71
2017/18	40,035	71
2018/19	41,583	72
2019/20	42,289	72
2020/21	36,330	
2021/22	41,739	

=== Surveys and other studies ===
==== Violence against women and children ====
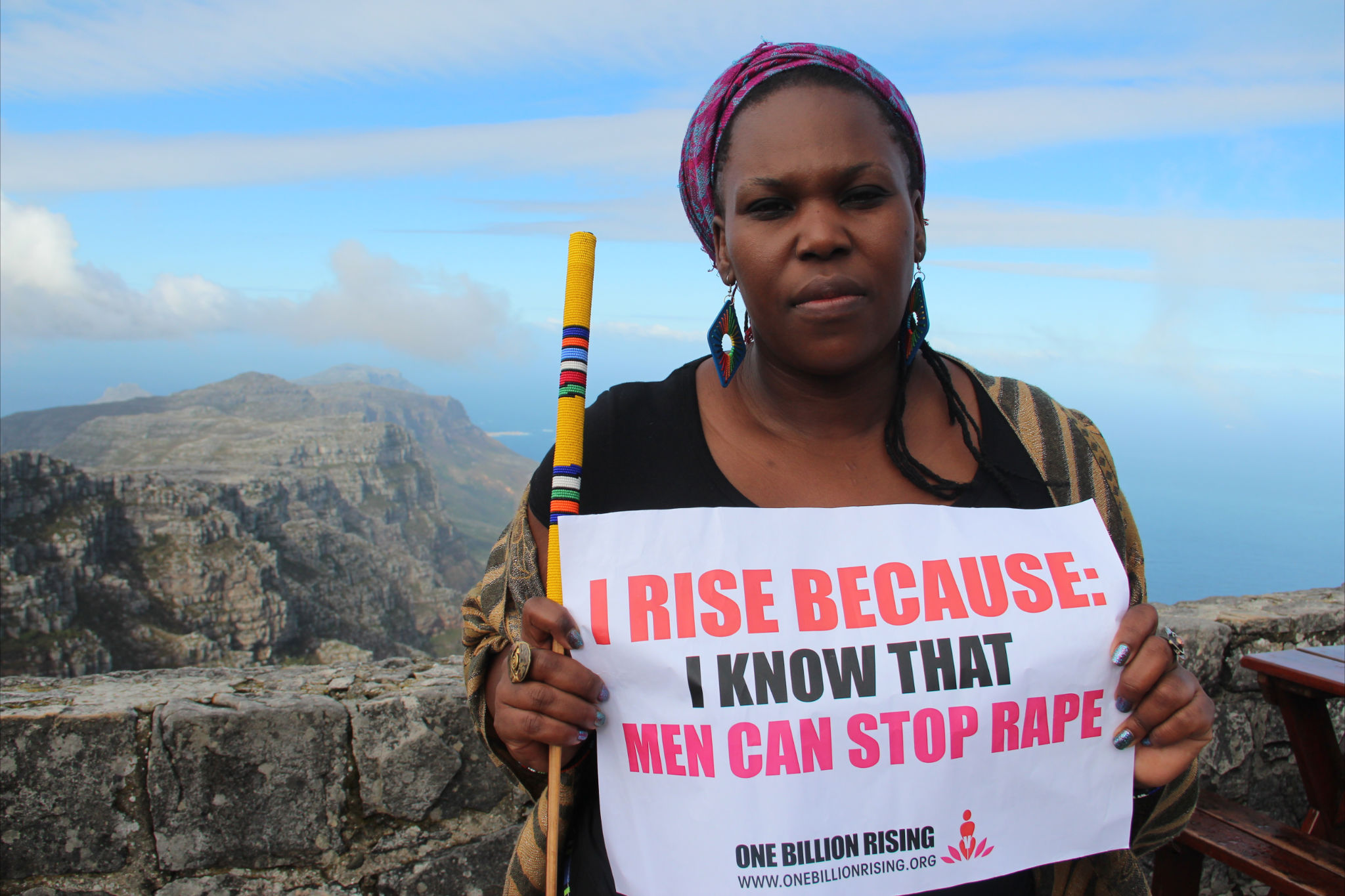
South African actress Andrea Dondolo on Table Mountain in Cape Town, as part of One Billion rising, to call for an end to violence against women and girls

In 1998, one in three of the 4,000 women questioned in Johannesburg had been raped, according to Community Information, Empowerment and Transparency (CIET) Africa. And while women's groups in South Africa estimated that (as of 2001) a woman was raped every 26 seconds, the South African police estimates that a woman is raped every 36 seconds.

The comprehensive study 'Rape in South Africa' in 2000 indicated that 2.1% of women aged 16 years or older across population groups reported that they had been sexually abused at least once between the beginning of 1993 and March 1998, results which seem to conflict starkly with the MRC survey results. Similarly, the South African demographic and health survey of 1998 gave results of rape prevalence at 4.0% of all women aged between 15 and 49 years in the sampled households (a survey also performed by the Medical Research Council and Department of Health).

South Africa has some of the highest incidences of child and baby rape in the world, with more than 67,000 cases of rape and sexual assaults against children reported in 2000, with welfare groups believing that unreported incidents could be up to 10 times higher. The humanitarian news organization IRIN estimated that around 500,000 rapes were committed in South Africa each year. In a 2009 survey conducted by the South African Medical Research Council in KwaZulu-Natal and Eastern Cape provinces, 27.6% of the men interviewed admitted to having raped a woman or a girl. Of those, 46.3% said they had raped more than one person and 7.7% said they had raped more than 10. HIV prevalence among rape perpetrators was not significantly higher. There is no evidence to support the claim that the high rates of rape are motivated by the folk belief that sexual intercourse with a virgin can "cleanse" HIV.

The 2022 gender-based violence study conducted by South Africa's Human Sciences Research Council found that 9.8% of women nationally had experienced sexual violence in their lifetimes, regardless of partnership status. 7.9% had experienced lifetime sexual Intimate partner sexual violence, while 7.5% of South African men had perpetuated intimate partner sexual violence in their lifetimes. The study found that "lifetime sexual violence was significantly higher among women who were cohabiting but not married [14.9%] compared to women who were currently married [8.5%]".

==== Violence against the LGBT community ====
Violence against gender minorities is common in South Africa, with 48% of lesbian women reporting having experienced sexual violence in their lifetime.

A 2019 study found that the majority of the violence against LGBTQ people in South Africa was linked to homophobia, noting that "more than half of all participants (61%), and two out of three Black participants (67%) felt that the violence they experienced was linked to their sexual orientation and gender identity. Among gender minority participants [transgender and nonbinary individuals], this was even higher, at 70% of participants".

Comparing their findings to other research on sexual violence amongst the population at large in South Africa, the study notes that "the lifetime prevalence of sexual violence among LGBTQ people is very much higher than among the general population". On violence victimization along racial lines, it noted that "black participants had also experienced slightly higher levels of all forms of violence, compared to white participants, although these differences were not always statistically significant".

==== Violence against men ====
The 2022 gender-based violence study conducted by South Africa's Human Sciences Research Council found that 2.3% of adult South African men had been sexually victimized in their lifetimes (outside of the home), whilst 1.3% had admitted to sexually assaulting other men.

=== Regional differences ===
Provinces of South Africa

There are deviations in sexual violence rates in different provinces of South Africa.

In a study of three South African provinces (Eastern Cape, Mpumalanga, and Limpopo) in 1997, 6.8% of women surveyed in Mpumalanga said they had been raped during their lifetime, 5.0% of women surveyed in Limpopo had been raped, and 4.5% of women in Eastern Cape had been raped. In 1998, the region of Gauteng accounted for the largest percentage of prisoners in custody for sexual offences with 20.6%, and the Western Cape had the second largest percentage with 17.3%. The province with the least percentage of prisoners convicted of sexual offences was Northern Cape with 3.8% and Limpopo with 2.6%.

The South African Crime Survey 2003 highlights the regional differences of citizens' perceptions and fears. Surveying what type of crime respondents thought occurred most in their area of residence, 14.6% of Northern Cape respondents reported that they believed rape to be the most prevalent type of crime. While the Northern Cape had the largest percentage of respondents who believed rape to be most prevalent, the province of KwaZulu-Natal had the least, with 1.7%.

Averaging all provinces, rape ranked 7th in the crime that respondents thought was most prevalent, after housebreaking, property theft, robbery, murder, livestock theft, and assault. This survey also investigated what type of crime respondents feared most in their area. Rape ranked third in this category after only murder and housebreaking. 40.8% of respondents in the Northern Cape and 31.8% of respondents in Free State feared rape the most. On the other side of the spectrum, 11.6% of KwaZulu-Natal and 12.1% of respondents in Mpumalanga stated rape as the crime they were most afraid of in their area.

By September 2019, South African President Cyril Ramaphosa acknowledged that sexual violence against women had grown in South Africa, The nation's "Mother City" Cape Town has seen an extended use of military deployment to combat sexual violence against women as well.

== Types ==
=== Violence against women ===
The South African government reports that one of these reasons is the culture of patriarchy in South Africa. Its report states that patriarchy is firmly rooted in black and white culture, and fighting it is seen as attempting to destroy South African tradition or South African ideals.

The danger from rape and sexual assault is compounded because of the prevalence of HIV/AIDS in South African townships. A woman being raped over the age of 25 has a one in four chance that her attacker is HIV positive and more women than men are affected from HIV/AIDS. The perpetrators of rape in South Africa tend to be men known to the victim. It is reported that a husband or boyfriend kills a woman every six hours in South Africa. Many men and women say that rape cannot occur in relationships; however, one in four women reported having been abused by an intimate partner. In 1993 South Africa outlawed marital rape. In September 2019, President Ramaphosa responded to a surge in violence against women by calling for the passage of laws making rape punishable by death and called an emergency session of the South African Parliament.

=== Violence against infants and children ===
South Africa has some of the highest incidences of child and infant rape in the world. The Tears Foundation and the MRC stated 50% of South Africa's children will be abused before the age of 18. The MRC study stated that, in 2009, 15% were under 12 years old. In 2017, the police reported that 9% of reported rape are those of children nine years old or younger, with agencies reporting an increase throughout the country. Although there are varying numbers on the number of reported rapes of children, one report states that in 2000, 21,538 rapes and attempted rapes of children under the age of 18 were reported and another from 2001 states that there were 24,892 rapes. Child welfare groups believe that the number of unreported incidents could be up to 10 times that number. The largest increase in attacks was against children under seven. A trade union report said a child was being raped in South Africa every three minutes. Some cite a 400% increase in sexual violence against children in the decade preceding 2002 and that it may still be on the rise. A third of cases involve a family member or close relative.

Many high-profile infant rapes appeared since 2001 (including the fact that they required extensive reconstructive surgery to rebuild urinary, genital, abdominal, or tracheal systems). In October 2001, a nine-month-old girl named Tshepang was raped by an HIV-positive man and had to undergo extensive reconstructive surgery in Cape Town. In February 2002, an eight-month-old infant was reportedly gang raped by four men. One has been charged. The infant has required extensive reconstructive surgery. The 8-month-old infant's injuries were so extensive that increased attention on prosecution has occurred.

A significant contributing factor for the escalation in child abuse is the widespread myth in HIV ravaged South Africa that having sex with a virgin will cure a man of AIDS. This virgin cleansing myth exists in Zambia, Zimbabwe and Nigeria. The child abusers are often relatives of their victims and are at times their fathers or providers.

=== Corrective rape ===
Lesbians in certain parts of South Africa also face a dangerous environment. Raping lesbians (a practice referred to as corrective rape) is believed to convert them to heterosexuality. The South African government reported to CEDAW that lesbians and gays are discriminated against in many spheres. The government has been accused of condoning the practice for fear of not appearing "macho".

One notable case of this was the gang-rape and murder of Eudy Simelane, a member of the South African football team and LGBT-rights activist. Thirty-one lesbians have died from these attacks in the last 10 years, and more than ten lesbians per week are raped or gang-raped in Cape Town alone.

Corrective rape is also perpetrated against gay men. A 2003 study conducted by Out LGBT Well-Being (Out) and the University of South Africa Centre for Applied Psychology (UCAP) discovered that the percentage of black gay men who said they have experienced corrective rape matched that of the black lesbians who participated in the study. Stigmatization of male victims was said to be the cause of low reporting rates for corrective gay rape.

=== Violence against men ===
About 3.5% of men have been forced to have sex with other men in a 2009 Medical Research Council survey. About 19.4% of all adult victims of sexual assault in South Africa in 2012 were male. Another group's survey estimates that one in five adult males becomes a victim of sexual offences, and this figure could be much higher, as a male is 10 times less likely to report a sexual violation than a woman. There are very few support networks for male victims of rape in the country, which makes it difficult for men to report being raped.

=== Prison rape ===
Nearly half of all South African inmates surveyed by the Judicial Inspectorate for Correctional Services reported that sexual abuse happens "sometimes", "often", or "very often". Sexual violence in prisons is linked to gang violence and its power structures, and inmates who are sexually abused are targets for repeated abuse, and usually are victimized again and again. Survivors of prison rape have told that officials in the country are of the opinion that "[males should] expect this treatment in prison", and scholarship has found that "new inmates in male prisons are raped upon arrival by all members of any given cell". The high prevalence of prison rape has been tied to the high rate of HIV infection in the country.

== Perpetrators ==
=== Men ===
In 2014 and 2015, a Western Cape study estimated that 15% of men had raped a woman who was not their partner. A Gauteng study conducted in 2010 revealed that 37.4% of men admitted to raping a woman. More than 25% of a sample of 1,738 South African men from the KwaZulu-Natal and Eastern Cape Provinces admitted to raping someone when anonymously questioned in 2009; of these, nearly half said they had raped more than one person, according to a non-peer reviewed policy brief issued by the Medical Research Council (MRC). Several news publications wrongly extrapolated these results to the rest of the South African population, giving reported rape prevalence several times higher in the two provinces in question. Nearly three out of four men who admitted rape stated they had first forced a woman or girl into sex before the men were the age of 20, and nearly one in ten admitted to doing so before the age of 10.

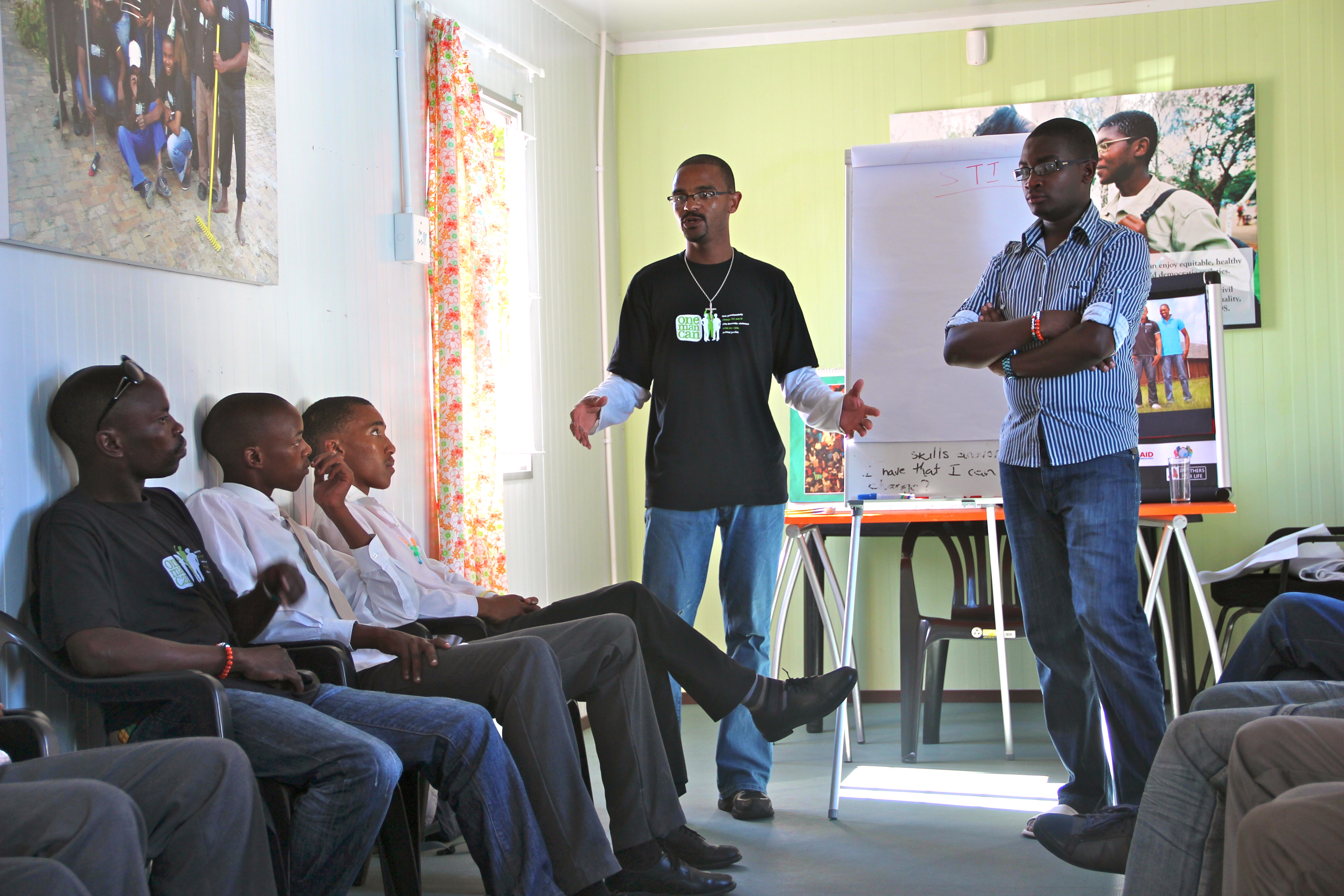
The Sonke Gender Justice programme in South Africa aims to transform attitudes to girls and women among men and boys.

The Medical Research Council states, "Many forms of sexual violence, particularly sexual harassment and forms of sexual coercion that do not involve physical force, are widely viewed as normal male behaviour." It also said practices such as gang rape were common because they were considered a form of male bonding. Market Research Africa, a Johannesburg-based market research agency, reported in 1994 that 76% of men felt that women had a right to say no to sex, one third thought that women could not decide for themselves on abortion, and 10% condoned a man beating a woman or his wife.

=== Children and adolescents ===
Among children, a 2007 survey by CIET found 60% of both boys and girls, aged 10 to 19 years old, thought it was not violent to force sex upon someone they knew, while around 11% of boys and 4% of girls admitted to forcing someone else to have sex with them. The study also found that 12.7% of the students believed in the virgin cleansing myth.

In a related survey conducted among 1,500 school children in the Johannesburg township of Soweto, a quarter of all the boys interviewed said that 'jackrolling', a term for gang rape, was fun. Furthermore, more than half the interviewees insisted that when a girl says no to sex she really means yes. It is also noteworthy that those in this study were school children as age is significantly associated with rape. Men from ages 20–40 are more likely to have raped younger or older men.

=== Teachers ===
Another issue with sexual violence against minors in South Africa is the sexual abuse and harassment that is reported to occur in schools by teachers and other students. According to the Human Rights Watch, girls from all levels of society and ethnic groups have been subjected to sexual violence at school in bathrooms, empty classrooms, dormitories, and more. Police, prosecutors, and social workers have also complained that many incidents of sexual violence in schools are not reported to them because schools often prefer to deal with it internally, thus hindering justice against the perpetrators. The danger of sexual violence in schools has created a barrier for girls to seek education. HRW also reported that South African girls' school performance suffers after an incident of sexual violence.

== Law ==
The government of the Republic of South Africa is cognizant of this problem. The Bill of Rights in the Constitution of South Africa is intended to ensure the rights of all people in South Africa, grounded in the democratic values of human dignity, equality, and freedom. Furthermore, it calls for the right to freedom and security, including freedom from all forms of violence by either public or private sources and the right to bodily and psychological integrity, including reproduction and bodily security. South Africa is also a member of the UN Convention for the Elimination of all Discrimination Against Women, where it reported on some issues of sexual violence. It reported about how the Truth and Reconciliation Commission offered a platform for the voices of victims of violence and sexual violence during the Apartheid. It also reported details on the Judicial Authority of South Africa, where the lower courts are responsible for important issues such as sexual assault and family violence.

The Parliament of South Africa has enacted the Criminal Law (Sexual Offences and Related Matters) Amendment Act, 2007, which has been in effect since 16 December 2007. The comprehensive act seeks to review and amend all laws relating to sexual offences and to strengthen them. The preamble of the amendment calls for scrutiny of the problem in South Africa, noting that it "is reflective of deep-seated, systemic dysfunctionality in our society". The amendment defines sexual violence as including, but not limited to, the following forms:

- rape and compelled rape
- sexual assault
- compelled assault and compelled self-sexual assault
- forced witness of sexual body parts
- child pornography
- incest
- bestiality
- acts of necrophilia

It also adds measures in the matters of sexual offences against children (including consensual sexual acts), sexual exploitation, exposure to pornography, forced witness of sexual acts, and sexual offences against the mentally disabled. Furthermore, the amendment provides services for victims of sexual offences and compulsory HIV testing of alleged sex offenders and creates a national registry for sex offenders. The Department of Justice also conducted a major national Campaign on Prevention of Violence Against Women, launched on 25 November 1996, as an education campaign.

The offense of rape is defined by the Criminal Law (Sexual Offences and Related Matters) Amendment Act, 2007. This act has repealed the common law offence of rape, replacing it with a broader statutory offense which is defined in section 3 of the act as follows:

Any person ("A") who unlawfully and intentionally commits an act of sexual penetration with a complainant ("B"), without the consent of B, is guilty of the offence of rape.

and "sexual penetration" is defined as:

any act which causes penetration to any extent whatsoever by—

(a) the genital organs of one person into or beyond the genital organs, anus, or mouth of another person;
(b) any other part of the body of one person or, any object, including any part of the body of an animal, into or beyond the genital organs or anus of another person; or
(c) the genital organs of an animal, into or beyond the mouth of another person[.]

Marital rape is illegal; section 56 of the act provides that:

Whenever an accused person is charged with an offence under section 3, 4, 5, 6 or 7 it is not a valid defence for that accused person to contend that a marital or other relationship exists or existed between him or her and the complainant.

Concerning sentencing, S.3(aA) of the Criminal Law (Sentencing) Amendment Act 2007 provides that:

When imposing a sentence in respect of the offence of rape the following shall not constitute substantial and compelling circumstances justifying the imposition of a lesser sentence:

(i) The complainant's previous sexual history;
(ii) an apparent lack of physical injury to the complainant;
(iii) an accused person's cultural or religious beliefs about rape; or
(iv) any relationship between the accused person and the complainant prior to the offence being committed.

=== Report and conviction rates ===
It is estimated that over 40% of South African women will be raped in their lifetime and that only one in nine rapes are reported. It is also estimated that 14% of perpetrators of rape are convicted in South Africa. In 1997, violence against women was added as one of the priority crimes under the National Crime Prevention Strategy; nevertheless, the rates of reported rape, sexual abuse of children and domestic violence continue to rise.

The South African report to CEDAW partly attributes the low report and conviction rate to the post-apartheid public perception of the police force. Moreover, the report states that the attitudes and prejudices of law enforcement agencies and other government personnel, as well as the inaccessibility of services, particularly in rural areas, are also part of the problem. Much of the South African public regards the police as symbols of the oppressors during apartheid; thus, poor faith in the police is still instilled in the post-apartheid country.

Other institutional barriers contribute to the low reporting and conviction rates. The "cautionary rule" is a law that requires a judge to show awareness of special dangers in relying on uncorroborated evidence of a complainant, lowering this rate and making victims of sexual violence feel as if the court will deem them untrustworthy. According to a survey that questioned rape victims who did not report the crime to the police, 33.3% of victims cited they feared reprisals, 9.6% cited that they felt the police would not be able to solve the crime, and 9.2% cited embarrassment as their reasons for not reporting the crime.

== Responses ==
The South African Government has passed legislation to address gender equity more generally and domestic violence in particular. The Sexual Offences and Community Affairs Unit was established in 1999 within the National Prosecuting Authority (NPA) of the Department of Justice. Specialised Sexual Offences Courts (SOCs) dedicated to sexual violence were established in 2005.

=== Thuthuzela Care Centres ===
Since 1999 the Sexual Offences and Community Affairs Unit (SOCA), which sits under the National Prosecuting Authority, worked with USAID to develop the model which developed into the Thuthuzela Care Centre (TCC). In 2006, established a model of one-stop facilities known as the Thuthuzela Care Centre (TCC). Their aim is "to turn gender-based violence (GBV) victims to survivors through psychosocial, medical, and legal support", which they do by providing emergency medical care, psychosocial care, case management, and legal support. TCCs offer a cohesive intervention, using a multi-disciplinary approach to prevent and combat the problem of GBV. Government departments, including Justice, Health, Social Development, Treasury, work alongside NGOs which coordinate counselling services by social workers. The name is derived from the Xhosa word thuthuzela, meaning "comfort".

In an information leaflet, a TCC is described as "a designated health facility that provides forensic and medical services to rape survivors as an emergency service in the 72 hours immediately after a rape". Many centres have been established throughout the country; as of September 2022, there were 58. Funding is provided by the government, but the private sector has begun to help with building more TCCs, some on private hospital sites. Still, the sites must be linked to a police station. TCCs run public awareness campaigns, and also provide measures to reduce HIV/AIDS to rape victims.

A small study published in 2015 using data collected at four TCCs in Gauteng during 2012-2014 found that "service delivery was experienced as satisfactory and that a positive relationship existed between the victim and TCC staff". Each stakeholder in the TCC is accountable from the moment the case is opened to its conclusion, a measure which, according to a 2023 study, has improved conviction rates ten-fold. Over the five years up to 2023, cases dealt with by the TCCs led to more severe gaol sentences for rape in courts. TCCs are credited with helping to reduce trial completion time for cases from two years to just over seven months, and for producing conviction rates of 84–89%. The TCC model has been held by the UN as a "best practice model" for sexual violence support centre.

In Cape Town, there are three TCCs: at Karl Bremer Hospital, Heideveld Hospital, and Victoria Hospital (at which the forensic unit is situated). In 2012–2013, the Sinawe TCC, located in Mthatha, Eastern Cape Province, won an award for being "the best-run care centre in South Africa".

=== Other initiatives ===
Grass-roots initiatives and protests have helped to drive the creation of various progressive laws and other initiatives to combat gender-based violence; for example, the Shukumisa Coalition comprises more than 60 organisations focused on sexual violence against women and children. In 2018, the Total Shutdown Movement protested on the streets against inaction by the government and businesses. Following this, a National Summit on Gender Based Violence and Femicide was held, including the government, the Total Shutdown Movement, and various organisations, which culminated in a signed "declaration that the government, businesses, labour and civil society would collaborate to conceptualise, drive and implement concrete measures to eradicate gender-based violence and femicide". The government then implemented a "National Strategic Plan for GBVF" (NSP).

== Media portrayal ==
This problem is portrayed to the public through various media channels. Media reports documenting high levels of sexual violence in South Africa have increased in the media since the 1990s.

Others have condemned South African sexual violence in the media as fitting into a specific narrative of only broadcasting incidents where the victims are white, middle-class and educated and are not attacked by their peers or family members.

=== News and events ===
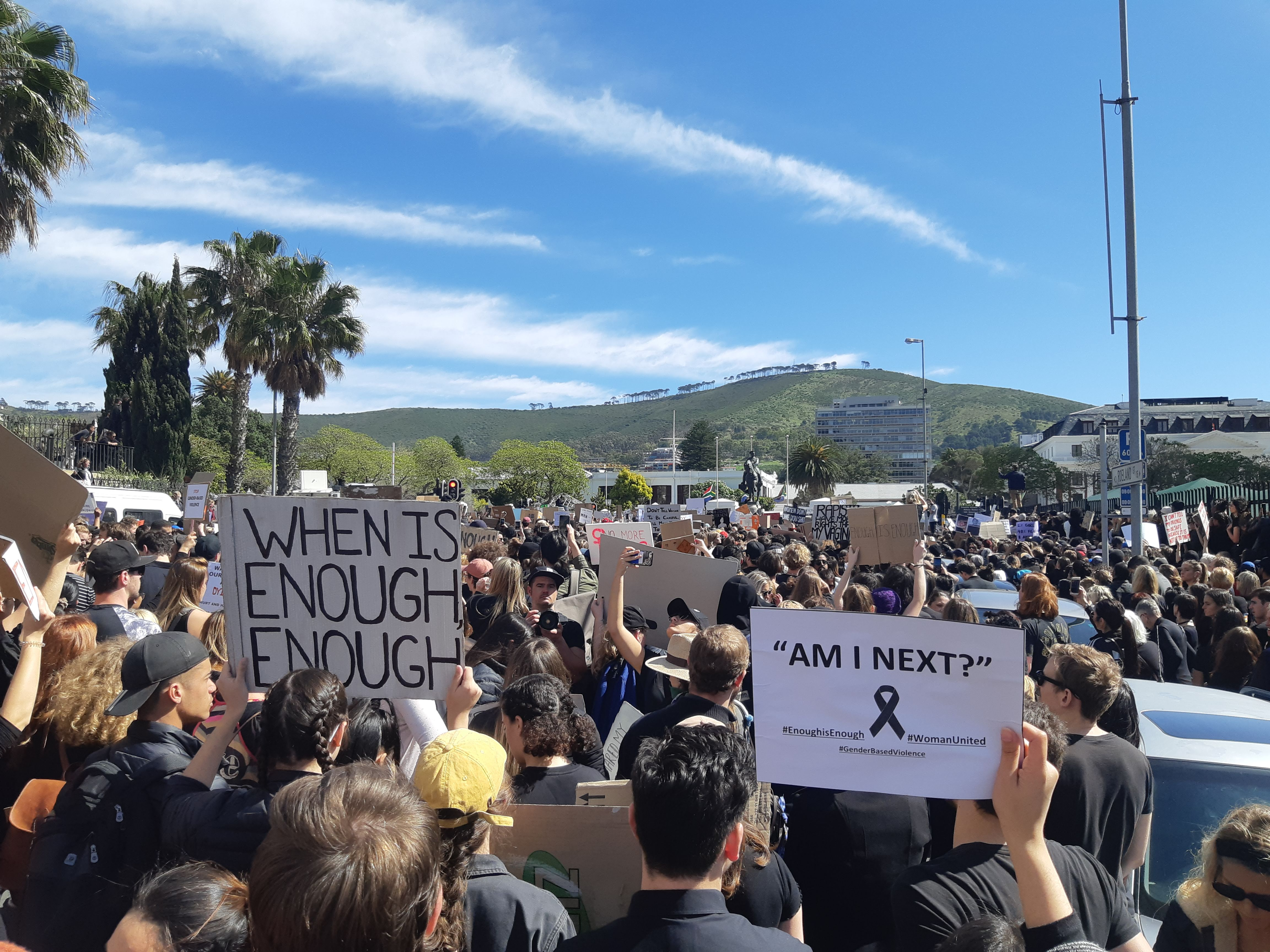
Demonstration against sexual violence in South Africa following the murder of Uyinene Mrwetyana, 2019

However, there are many news stories and events dealing with sexual violence in South Africa that have garnered a lot of international attention.

In April 1999, a female American UNICEF official visiting South Africa on business was gang raped during a robbery of the home where she was staying.

The former president of South Africa, Jacob Zuma, was accused of raping the HIV-positive 31-year-old daughter of a family friend in November 2005, before he was president. He was acquitted by the court in 2006, yet he did admit to consensual unprotected sex with the woman. This event was widely covered by the press.

One particularly well-known publication of rape in South Africa was Charlene Leonora Smith's report of her own rape. As a journalist of the Mail and Guardian and having contributed to articles for the Washington Post and BBC, Smith claimed that "rape is endemic" in the culture of South Africa.

Another scandal of sexual violence in South Africa involved the media tycoon Oprah Winfrey's school, Oprah Winfrey Leadership Academy for Girls, in Johannesburg, South Africa. The dormitory matron, Tiny Virginia Makopo, was charged with 13 separate counts of abuse against students at the school.

A particularly controversial issue was an episode of Big Brother Africa in South Africa where Richard Bezuidenhout, a 24-year-old film student, allegedly sexually assaulted his housemate, Ofunneka Molokwu, a 29-year-old medical assistant. While many watchers disagree on what was actually shown, some saw Bezuidenhout manually penetrating Molokwu while she was unconscious or intoxicated while another housemate pleaded with him to stop. After the contested non-consensual act ceased, the producers intervened, sending paramedics into the house and cutting the live feed. News publications and blogs have widely discussed this controversy.

Another contentious issue was when the only black player in the South African cricket team, Makhaya Ntini, was convicted of the rape of a 22-year-old student. This was particularly controversial as Ntini was the first black cricketer to represent South Africa on an international level and was viewed as a role model. However, Ntini won his appeal against his rape conviction and had his six-year jail sentence overturned.

In contrast to these scandals of sexual violence, action against sexual violence in South Africa has also been featured in the news and media. A protest against sexual violence that was portrayed in the media occurred in 2012, when the African National Congress Women's League called on hundreds of South Africans to engage in a "mini-skirt march" to protest the attack of two women in Johannesburg for wearing short skirts. In response to corrective rape, the New York Festivals Television and Film Awards Gala at the NAB Show in Las Vegas will award ESPN for their E:60 production, "Corrective Rape", with the Gold Award. This award was established in 1990 to films that reflected the ideals of the United Nations and signifies that the issue of corrective rape is becoming more discussed on an international level.

In late August 2019, student Uyinene Mrwetyana was raped and murdered by a post office attendant who was working in Claremont, Cape Town. Her death highlighted the broader national problem of gender based violence and femicide in South Africa, and is credited with "shifting the South African collective consciousness" and "igniting a movement".

=== Literature and fiction ===
Some novels and movies have also delved into this issue in its connection to the Apartheid. Antjie Krog's Country of My Skull delves into the Truth and Reconciliatory Commission and the reports of women that were victims of sexual violence during the Apartheid. J. M. Coetzee's novel, Disgrace, has been accused of racism as it depicts a young white woman being raped by three black men in her house in the Eastern Cape of South Africa. The book, The Writing Circle, by Rozena Maart, depicts a group of young women's experiences with rape and other forms of violence living in Cape Town, South Africa. The 2006 documentary, Rape for Who I Am, delves into the lives of black lesbians living in South Africa.

== See also ==
- RapeaXe, an anti-rape device which was invented in South Africa
- Rape statistics
- Estimates of sexual violence
- Sexual violence in the Democratic Republic of the Congo
- Sexual violence in Papua New Guinea
- Crime in South Africa
- Corrective rape
- HIV/AIDS in South African townships
