= Bigshoes Foundation =

HIV/AIDS charity in South Africa, 2002–2012

The Bigshoes Foundation
- Established: 2002
- Founder: Michelle Meiring
- Defunct: 2012
- Type: Non-profit organization
- Website: www.bigshoe.info/

The Big Shoes Foundation is a non-profit organization based in Johannesburg, South Africa, that provides medical goods and services to children affected by HIV/AIDS.

It was reported that Bigshoes was closing down in December 2012 following large losses due to fraud.
