= Maranatha Living Hope Academy =

Private school in Laguna, Philippines

- Type: Private School
- Established: 1990
- Affiliations: Maranatha Community of Praise & Ministries Inc.
- Principal: Nenita N. Hemedez
- Students: Approximately 200
- Location: Lucero St., Brgy. Malusak, Santa Rosa City, Laguna, Philippines; 14°18′41″N 121°06′48″E
- Colors: Green
- Nickname: MLHA

The Maranatha Living Hope Academy, commonly known as Maranatha or simply MLHA, is a private non-sectarian school located at Barangay Malusak, Santa Rosa City, Laguna, Philippines.
