= HealthBridge =

Non-profit organisation in Cincinnati, Ohio

HealthBridge Inc.
- Formation: 1997
- Type: Non-profit organization
- Location: Cincinnati, OH, USA
- Key people: Craig Brammer; (CEO); Keith Hepp; (CFO); Jason W. Buckner; (SVP, Informatics); Mike Wells; (Director of Information Security)
- Website: www.healthcollab.org

HealthBridge is a service line of The Health Collaborative, a not-for-profit corporation located in Cincinnati, Ohio, United States. HealthBridge supports health information technology (HIT) adoption, health information exchange (HIE), and innovative use of information for improved health care outcomes. HealthBridge is recognized as one of the nation’s largest, most advanced, and most financially sustainable health information exchange (HIE) organizations.

HealthBridge was founded in 1997 as a community effort to develop a common technology infrastructure for sharing health information electronically in the Greater Cincinnati tri-state area.

As a result of HealthBridge and its community partners’ efforts, more than 30 million clinical tests, images, and other clinical results are transmitted each year to authorized physicians through HealthBridge’s secure electronic network. HealthBridge serves more than 30 hospitals, 7500 physicians, 800 practices, as well as local health departments, nursing homes, independent labs, radiology centers and other health care entities across multiple communities in four states.
