= Sinikithemba Choir =

South African choir

Sinikithemba Choir is an all-female HIV-positive South African choir. They were brought to the US by Tim Janis. The group's solo discography includes the album Living Hope 2003.
