= Health information exchange =

Mobilization of health care information electronically across organizations

Health Information Exchange (HIE) is the electronic exchange of health care information across organizations within a region, community, or hospital system. Participants in this data exchange are collectively called Health Information Networks (HINs). HIE may also refer to the Health Information Organization (HIO) facilitating the exchange. HIE aims to facilitate access to and retrieval of clinical data, particularly to support public health authorities in analyzing the health of the population.

In the United States, the Office of the National Coordinator for Health Information Technology supports statewide health information exchange through financial grants. These grants were legislated into the HITECH components of the American Recovery and Reinvestment Act of 2009. Regional Health Information Organizations (RHIOs) are typically geographically defined entities that develop and manage contractual agreements, facilitate electronic information exchange, and establish and maintain HIE standards. Federal and state regulations regarding HIEs and health information technology (HIT) are still being defined. Federal regulations and incentive programs such as "Meaningful Use", formally known as the EHR Incentive Program, are changing. Most HIEs and RHIOs remain tied to federal, state, or independent grant funding to remain operational. Some exceptions exist, such as the Indiana HIE.

== Storage and gathering of information ==
=== Data architecture models ===
In a centralized model of HIE, there is a central (or master) database that holds a copy of every patient’s records. Information is uploaded to a single database from which any provider in the HIE can access and download. In a federated model of HIE, there is no master database; records are exchanged electronically among providers when needed.

=== Patient consent ===
Exchanges in the US must operate with patient consent to comply with not only the Health Insurance Portability and Accountability Act (HIPAA) but also a variety of state and federal laws and regulations. This was clarified by the Office of Civil Rights in the January 2013 Final Omnibus Rule Update to HIPAA.

Explicit consent and implicit consent are two methods for gaining patient consent. With explicit consent, or opt-in, a patient is not automatically enrolled into the HIE by default and generally must submit a written request to join the exchange. In implicit patient consent, or opt-out, patients give implicit consent to join an HIE when they agree to use the services of a healthcare provider who participates in an HIE and sign the provider's Notice Of Privacy Practices. Patients can request to opt out of the HIE, generally with a written form.

== Notable European health information exchanges ==
=== Netherlands ===
Frysian Health Information Exchange

Connecting the Medical Centre Leeuwarden and the Academic Center in Groningen with community hospitals such as Nij Smellinghe Hospital in Drachten, the Friesland Regional Cardiology Network reduces patient hospital stays by one or two days. Once records are uploaded to the cardiology network, they remain available for consultation at any time, allowing healthcare providers to review a patient's previous episodes of care.

==== North of the Netherlands – XDS Network ====
Hospitals in the Dutch provinces Groningen, Friesland, and Drenthe have created a (diagnostic) image exchange network to phase out CD/DVD-based exchanges using an HIE (XDS) platform. St. Gerrit, the local HIE organization, has gradually expanded the network since 2014, spanning 10 hospitals to date.

==== Others ====
- ZorgNetOost
- Radboud University Medical Center
- Image Exchange South East-Brabant – Maxima Medical Center, Elkerliek Hospital, Catharina Hospital Eindhoven, St. Anna Hospital
- Regional Exchange Network West-Brabant
- Image Exchange Network Breda – Amphia Hospital, Dr. Bernard Verbeeten Institute, Elisabeth-TweeSteden Hospital
- Rotterdam Exchange Network RijnmondNet
- Zorgring Noord-Holland Noord

=== United Kingdom ===
- Sussex and Surrey
- Bristol
- Great Ormond Street Hospital

=== Ireland ===
- NIMIS

=== Finland ===
- Helsinki-Uusimaa Health District

== Notable United States health information exchanges ==
=== Individual exchanges ===
Chesapeake Regional Information System for our Patients
CRISP is a non-profit corporation that is implementing health information exchange in the state of Maryland. The organization is also the Health IT Extension Center for Maryland. CRISP was created by Johns Hopkins Medicine, MedStar Health, the University of Maryland Medical System and Erickson Retirement Communities. Audacious Inquiry, a health information system consulting firm, is the technical architect and partner for the health information exchange while Dynamed Solutions provides operational, project management, and organizational support under CRISP.

Health Current
Health Current, formerly Arizona Health-e Connection (AzHeC), is the health information exchange (HIE) that shares information across Arizona. Health Current grew out of a gubernatorial executive order in 2007.

Delaware Health Information Network
Delaware Health Information Network (DHIN) is a non-profit public-private partnership enacted by the Delaware General Assembly in 1997. DHIN has adopted regulations to govern its operations and has policies and procedures. DHIN started in May 2007. In February 2012, The Delaware Health Information Network announced the full participation of all acute care hospitals and skilled nursing facilities in the state, along with the majority of Delaware providers, in the first statewide community health record. As of June 2013, DHIN has the participation of 97 percent of Delaware providers, tracks around 88 percent of Delaware's population, and delivers more than 10 million clinical results and reports to participating providers annually.

Idaho Health Data Exchange
The Idaho Health Data Exchange (IHDE) is the state-designated Health Information Exchange (HIE) for Idaho. Health Information Exchange enables doctors, nurses, labs, and other medical providers to securely access their patient's electronic health information quickly, 24/7/365. IHDE is a non-profit 501(c)(6) company. Located in Boise, Idaho, the staff consists of an Executive Director, Executive Assistant, Sr. Marketing Coordinator, Business Analysts (Implementations), Training/Support Specialists, and IT systems support. Members of the Board of Directors and Privacy and Security Committee represent the private and public sectors and delivery systems.

Indiana Health Information Exchange
The Indiana Health Information Exchange (IHIE) operates the U.S. largest HIE and one of the oldest with data on more than 7 million patients. Created by the Regenstrief Institute, a medical informatics think tank, the Indiana Network for Patient Care (INPC) is a secure network that provides patient records to participating doctors. This HIE grew from 12 hospitals in the center of the state with approximately 5,000 physicians, to 106 hospitals out of 126 in the state and more than 14,000 physicians in Indiana.

Ohio Health Information Partnership
The Ohio Health Information Partnership (with CliniSync; HIE) is a nonprofit, public/private partnership initially funded with $14.8 million in federal HITECH funds under the Office of the National Coordinator for HIT. It is the state-designated statewide health information exchange founded by the Ohio State Medical Association, the Ohio Osteopathic Association, the Ohio Hospital Association, BioOhio, and the Ohio Department of Insurance. CliniSync is an independent nonprofit founded in 2009. It received $43.8 million in HITECH funding.
Federal funds paid for the creation of the technological infrastructure, powered by Medicity, as well as discounted implementation fees for hospitals in Ohio. As of 2016, CliniSync has 148 hospitals contracted, with 123 "live," and over 400 long-term and post-acute care facilities.
In 2015, CliniSync enabled practices and other authorized users to look up and find (query and retrieve) a longitudinal Community Health Record on a patient.
CliniSync members will receive notifications when a patient is discharged or admitted to the hospital or Emergency Department in late 2016.

== See also ==
- DICOM (Digital Imaging and Communications in Medicine)
- LOINC (Logical Observation Identifiers Names and Codes)
- Health informatics
- Health Level 7 (HL7)
- Integrating the Healthcare Enterprise (IHE)
- Medical imaging
- Regional Health Information Organization (RHIO)
