= Erickson Senior Living =

American retirement community developer

- Industry: Retirement community owner, manager, developer
- Founded: 1983
- Headquarters: Catonsville, Maryland
- Key people: R. Alan Butler, CEO; Debra B. Doyle, COO; Christian Sweetser, CFO
- Services: Independent living, assisted living, memory and skilled nursing care
- Number of employees: 17,000+
- Parent: Redwood Capital Investments LLC
- Website: www.ericksonseniorliving.com

Erickson Senior Living is an owner, manager and developer of retirement communities in the United States. It provides independent living, assisted living, memory and skilled nursing care, managing 20 campus-style retirement communities in 11 states. Headquartered in Catonsville, Maryland, it employs over 17,000 people for 24,000 residents as of 2024.

== Company history ==
Erickson Senior Living was founded in 1983 by John C. Erickson as Erickson Retirement Communities. The first location was a conversion of a Baltimore seminary in Catonsville, Maryland. By 2009, Erickson operated a billion-dollar portfolio of properties in states from Massachusetts to Texas.

Erickson filed for Chapter 11 bankruptcy in 2009. The majority of that company's assets were purchased by Redwood Capital Investments, LLC for $365 million, and a new Erickson Living company was created as a subsidiary of Redwood Capital Investments, LLC. The company was renamed Erickson Senior Living in 2021.

In 2022, Redwood Capital Investments added an ownership stake in LCS, another senior living provider.

== Properties and services ==
Erickson Senior Living owns, manages, and operates campus-style retirement communities that provide independent living, assisted living, memory care and skilled nursing care. Residents pay an upfront deposit to secure an apartment home and a single monthly fee to cover most living expenses. Residents pay only for services they want or need, and if a resident moves out or dies, a percentage of the deposit is returned to them or their heirs when a new tenant for the apartment is found. As of 2018, Erickson had 20 managed communities in eleven states.

== Awards and recognition ==
In 2015, Erickson Senior Living was ranked as one of the top 10 senior living providers in the Assisted Living Federation of America's (ALFA) annual ranking of senior living providers by resident capacity. In that same listing, Erickson Senior Living ranked in the top five of independent living providers. In 2022, the American Seniors Housing Association (ASHA) ranked Erickson Senior Living as 14th largest senior housing owner and 5th largest senior housing operator in the ASHA 50, a listing of the largest owners and operators of senior housing communities in the United States.
