= Australian Health Informatics Education Council =

The Australian Health Informatics Education Council is the peak forum for the coordination of Health Informatics education in Australia.

The Council includes the major stakeholders in health informatics education in Australia, including the senior e-health organisations, universities, etc. AHIEC operates under the auspices of major Australian health informatics organisations.

AHIEC was founded in January 2009 and is undertaking a number of baseline projects based on the AHIEC Work Plan '2009-10 and Beyond'.

The Council functions are:

- working on coordinating standards for Health Informatics education
- support of HI education and workforce planning
- facilitation of collaboration

ACHI supports AHIEC through provision of a secretariat and organising of working meetings.
