= Australasian College of Health Informatics =

The Australasian College of Health Informatics is the professional body for health informatics in the Asia-Pacific region.

It consists of credentialed fellows and members as well as associate and student members. The college is an academic institutional member of the International Medical Informatics Association and a full member of the Australian Council of Professions. It was founded in 2002 and regularly provides comment and input to papers, proposals and legislative drafts in the region.

The college sees its functions as:

- standards setting for education and professional practice in health informatics
- support of health informatics initiatives
- facilitation of collaboration
- community mentoring

The college sponsors the electronic Journal of Health Informatics. It has also supported the Australian Health Informatics Education Council since its founding in 2009.

The college has Memoranda of Understanding with the Australian Library and Information Association, the Health Information Management Association of Australia and the Health Informatics Society of Australia.
