= Certification Commission for Healthcare Information Technology =

U.S. nonprofit organization

- Formation: 2004
- Dissolved: 2014
- Type: independent 501(c)(3) non profit
- Services: health care information
- Website: www.cchit.org

The Certification Commission for Health Information Technology (CCHIT) was an independent, 501(c)(3) nonprofit organization with the public mission of accelerating the adoption of robust, interoperable health information technology in the United States. The Commission certified electronic health record technology (EHR) from 2006 until 2014. It was approved by the Office of the National Coordinator for Health Information Technology (ONC) of the U.S. Department of Health and Human Services (HHS) as an Authorized Testing and Certification Body (ONC-ATCB). The CCHIT Certified program was an independently developed certification that included a rigorous inspection of an EHR's integrated functionality, interoperability, and security using criteria developed by CCHIT's broadly representative, expert work groups. These products may also be certified in the ONC-ATCB certification program. The Commission ceased all operations in 2014.

== History ==
CCHIT was founded in 2004 with support from three leading industry associations in healthcare information management and technology: the American Health Information Management Association (AHIMA), the Healthcare Information and Management Systems Society (HIMSS), and the National Alliance for Health Information Technology (the Alliance). In September 2005, CCHIT was awarded a 3-year contract by the U.S. Department of Health and Human Services (HHS) to develop and evaluate the certification criteria and inspection process for EHRs and the networks through which they interoperate. In October 2006, HHS officially designated CCHIT as a Recognized Certification Body (RCB). In July 2010, HHS published new rules for recognizing testing and certification bodies, which were scheduled to take effect when the new bodies were named. In September 2010, the Office of the National Coordinator (ONC) of HHS named CCHIT again under these new rules. CCHIT is an ONC-Authorized Testing and Certification Body (ONC-ATCB).

== Goals ==
- Reduce the risk of Healthcare Information Technology (HIT) investment by physicians and other providers
- Ensure interoperability (compatibility) of HIT products
- Assure payers and purchasers providing incentives for electronic health records (EHR) adoption that the ROI will be improved quality
- Protect the privacy of patients' personal health information.

== Operations ==
CCHIT focused its first efforts on ambulatory EHR products for office-based physicians and health care providers and began commercial certification in May 2006.

CCHIT then developed a certification process for inpatient EHR products and launched that program in 2007.

CCHIT then assessed the need for, and potential benefit of, certifying EHR for specialty medicine, special care settings, and special-needs populations.

CCHIT, in collaboration with the MITRE Corporation, also developed an open-source program called Laika to test EHR software for compliance with federally named interoperability standards.

In January 2014, Information Week reported that CCHIT would exit the EHR certification business.

On November 14, 2014, CCHIT ceased all operations.

=== Announcements of CCHIT Certified Products ===
- On July 18, 2006, CCHIT released its first list of 20 certified ambulatory EMR and EHR products
- On July 31, 2006, CCHIT announced that two additional EHR products had achieved certification.
- On October 23, 2006, CCHIT released its second list of 11 certified vendors.
- On April 30, 2007, CCHIT released its third list of 18 certified vendors.
- On July 27, 2010, CCHIT released certifications in Behavioral Health, Dermatology, and Long-term and Post-Acute Care EHRs.

== Commissioners ==
The Commission, chaired by Karen Bell, M.D., M.M.S, was composed of 21 members, each serving two-year terms.

== Stakeholders ==
Certified EHR products benefit many interested groups and individuals:

- Physicians, hospitals, health care systems, safety net providers, public health agencies and other purchasers of HIT products who seek quality, interoperability, data portability, and security
- Purchasers and payers – from government to the private sector – who are prepared to offer financial incentives for HIT adoption but need the assurance of having a mechanism in place to ensure that products deliver the expected benefits
- Quality improvement organizations that seek out an efficient means of measuring that criteria have been assessed and met
- Standards development and informatics experts that gain consensus on standards
- Vendors who benefit from having to meet a single set of criteria and from having a voice in the process
- Healthcare consumers, ultimately the most important stakeholders, who will benefit from a reliable, accurate, and secure record of their health.

CCHIT and its volunteer work groups strove to fairly represent the interests of each of these diverse groups in an open forum, communicating the progress of its work and seeking input from all quarters. CCHIT received the endorsements of a number of professional medical organizations, including the American Academy of Family Physicians, the American Academy of Pediatrics, the American College of Physicians, the Physicians' Foundation for Health Systems Excellence and Physicians' Foundation for Health Systems Innovation.

== See also ==
- Electronic health record
