= Health administration informatics =

Information systems in health care

The emerging field of health administration informatics is concerned with the evaluation, acquisition, implementation and day-to-day operation of information technology systems in support of all administration and clinical functions within the health care industry. The closely related field of biomedical informatics is primarily focused on the use of information systems for acquisition and application of patients' medical data, whereas nursing informatics deals with the delivery, administration and evaluation of patient care and disease prevention. What remains unclear, however, is how this emerging discipline should relate to the myriad of previously existing sub specializations within the broad umbrella of health informatics - including clinical informatics (which itself includes sub areas such as oncology informatics), bioinformatics and healthcare management informatics - particularly in light of the proposed "fundamental theorem" of biomedical informatics posed by Friedman in early 2009.

The field of health administration informatics is emerging as attention continues to focus on the costly mistakes made by some health care organizations whilst implementing electronic medical records.

== Relevance within the health care industry ==
In a recent survey of health care CIOs and Information System (IS) directors, increasing patient safety and reducing medical errors was reported as among the top business issues. Two other key findings were that:

- two-thirds of respondents indicated that the number of FTEs in their IT department will increase in the next 12 months;
- and three-quarters of respondents indicated that their IT budgets would be increasing.

The most likely staffing needs reported by the health care executives are network and architecture support (HIMMS, 2005).

“The government and private insurers are beginning to pay hospitals more for higher quality care–and the only way to measure quality, and then improve it, is with more information technology. Hospital spending on such gear is expected to climb to $30.5 billion next year, from $25.8 billion in 2004, according to researcher Dorenfest Group” (Mullaney and Weintraub, 2005).

This fundamental change in health care (pay for performance) means that hospitals and other health care providers will need to develop, adapt and maintain all of the technology necessary to measure and improve on quality. Physicians have traditionally lagged behind in their use of technology (i.e., electronic patient records). Only 7% of physicians work for hospitals, and so the task of “wooing them is an extremely delicate task” (Mullaney and Weintraub, 2005).

== Careers ==
The market demand for an advanced degree that integrates Health Care Administration and Informatics is growing as the concept has gained support from the academic and professional communities.Health Management Technology cite the importance of integrating information technology with health care administration to meet the needs of the health care industry. The industry has been estimated to be around 10 years behind others in the application of technology and behind in leadership capability from the technology and perhaps the business perspective (Seliger, 2005; Thibault, 2005). This means there is quantifiable demand in the work force for health care administrators who are also prepared to lead in the field of health care administration informatics.

In addition, the increasing costs and difficulties involved in evaluating the projected benefits from IT investments are requiring health care administrators to learn more about IT and how it affects business processes. The health care Chief Information Officer (CIO) must be able to build enterprise wide systems that will help reduce the administrative cost and streamline the automation of administrative processes and patient record keeping. Increasingly, the CIO is relied upon for specialized analytical and collaborative skills that will enable him/her to build systems that health care clinicians will use. A recent well-publicized debacle (shelving of a $34 million computer system after three months) at a top U. S. hospital underlines the need for leaders who understand the health care industry information technology requirements (Connolly, 2005).

Several professional organizations have also addressed the need for academic preparation that integrates the two specializations addressed by UMUC's MSHCAI degree. In the collaborative response to the Office of the National Coordinator for Health Information Technology (ONCHIT) request for information regarding future IT needs, thirteen major health and technology organizations endorsed a “Common Framework” to support health information exchange in the United States, while protecting patient privacy. The response cited the need for continuing education of health information management professionals as a significant barrier to implementation of a National Health Information Network (NHIN) (The Collaborative Response, 2005).

== See also ==
- Consumer health informatics
- Medical informatics
- Nursing informatics
