= Health informatics tools =

To provide the safe and effective delivery of medical care, virtually all clinical staff use a number of front-line health informatics tools in their day-to-day operations. The need for standardization and refined development of these tools is underscored by the HITECH Act and other efforts to develop electronic medical records. Often, the development of these electronic processes is hampered by the conversion process from older paper processes, which were developed before the stricter development guidelines required in an electronic environment.

To successfully implement each of these tools, hospitals generally must define who is responsible for, and a prescribed manner of building, testing, approving, coding, publishing, implementing/educating, and tracking the tool.

== Tools ==
Front-line health informatics tools (sometimes informally called the "clinical informatics toolbelt") generally include one of the following:

1. Policies and procedures – Tools used to define organizational standards and how to achieve them.
2. Procedures – Documents to help learn how to achieve a goal
3. Clinical protocols – Tools used to standardize and automate care in a common clinical scenario.
4. Orders – Tools used to record and transmit detailed instructions to perform a procedure or deliver care
5. Order sets – Tools used to standardize and expedite the ordering process for a common clinical scenario
6. Clinical pathways – Groupings of order sets, used to standardize the rounding process for a common clinical diagnosis
7. Guidelines – Documents used to educate general care objectives for a common clinical scenario
8. Clinical documentation (includes Notes, Forms, and Flowsheets) – Documents used to record and transmit a patients' history, condition, responses, therapies, activities, and/or plans
9. Clinical user profiles – Tools used to personalize and/or gather information about clinical users
10. Clinical templates – Documents used to standardize and expedite the development of a clinical document
11. Clinical staff education modules – Documents used to educate a staff member about a common clinical subject
12. Clinical patient education modules – Documents used to educate a patient about a common clinical subject
13. Clinical staff schedules – documents used to determine who is responsible for care at a particular date and time
14. Clinical committee charters – Documents used to assign responsibility to a clinical committee to perform a particular task
15. Clinical committee minutes – documents used to record the decisions and activities of a clinical committee
16. Telephone number lists – Documents used to help contact a clinical staffmember
17. Wikis – Electronic documents used to collect information and web links for a common clinical group
18. Clinic Management Solutions – Tools used to record full clinical history of patients.
19. Emails, posters, and staff meetings – Tools used to make announcements and deliver short messages

Clinical informaticists create clinical changes by properly constructing and implementing these tools.
