= Alberta Netcare =

The logo of Alberta Netcare.

Alberta Netcare (formerly Wellnet) is the province of Alberta's public Electronic Health Record used to store patient information so that it is easily accessible to healthcare professionals.

== Users ==
There are three main categories of Netcare users:

- Health service providers (physicians)
- Diagnostic laboratories
- Drug dispensing locations (pharmacies)

Netcare allows authorized physicians to view the medical records of patients. Pharmacies can use the service to verify prescription details, and to upload medication dispensations.

== Information stored and accessed ==
The patient's health record is stored on Netcare. Information like immunizations, ECG results, diagnostic images and reports, written medical reports (e.g. surgery reports, consultations, hospital admissions), diagnostic lab testing results (e.g. blood tests, urine tests, blood bank info), allergies and intolerances (drug and food allergies, food intolerances), drug checker (checks the prescribed medication and dose to see if it interacts with other medications or is unsuitable for people with certain allergies), prescription history, and general patient information (e.g. name, birthdate, personal health number, address, phone number).

== Implementation ==
Netcare messaging is performed with HL7-encoded XML messages. Messages are sent and received over a HTTPS connection.

== Security ==
Netcare uses a two-factor authentication protocol involving a username/password combination, and an RSA SecurID Key Fob for authentication. Users who are within the trusted networks of the Government of Alberta (e.g. hospitals) do not require the RSA key for login.

The SSL certificate for the remote login portal is TLS_RSA_WITH_3DES_EDE_CBC_SHA, 112 bit keys, TLS 1.2.

=== Breaches and attacks ===
From May 15–29, 2009 a Trojan virus was detected on several Alberta Health and Netcare systems, compromising the privacy of 11,582 Edmonton area patients.

== See also ==
- eHealth Ontario
