= Protocol system =

A computer-based protocol system is a paradigm providing a set of tools which allow health care providers access to current guidelines which they can apply in practice. Studies have shown that protocols can aid in optimising patient care. There are two types of protocol systems: passive and active.

In a healthcare setting, a protocol, also called a medical guideline, is a set of instructions which describe a process to be followed to investigate a particular set of findings in a patient, or the method which should be followed to control a certain disease.

== Protocol systems ==
Passive

Passive protocol systems are a source of information which health care providers have the freedom to choose to consult or not; they are not intrinsically incorporated into the healthcare process. The purpose of a passive protocol system is to give healthcare providers access to information which may remind healthcare providers of steps during patient care which may otherwise be forgotten or changed.

Active

Active protocol systems are specific guidelines for healthcare providers to follow. They are a central way which healthcare is delivered. Examples of active protocol systems include trigger-automated order entry systems and appointment scheduling. Active protocol systems may provide an explanation function which offers background information, definitions, risks, and the rationale that supports specific recommendations.
