= INFINITT Healthcare =

- Company type: Public
- Industry: Healthcare IT
- Founded: 1997
- Headquarters: Seoul, South Korea
- Area served: Worldwide
- Key people: Won Yong Lee(CEO)
- Products: Medical imaging and information technology solutions and services, PACS, VNA
- Number of employees: 400-500
- Website: http://www.infinitt.com/

INFINITT Healthcare Co. Ltd. is a South Korea-based healthcare IT development company. INFINITT Healthcare specializes in medical imaging and information technology, such as PACS, VNA, and cloud-based software and services.

== History ==
INFINITT Healthcare started from Mediface, which was the PACS R&D center at Medison and separately founded in 1997. In 2002, it merged with 3DMed and changed its name to INFINITT Technology. It acquired Marotech and Neobit in 2005 and Mevisys in 2007 and chose its current name "INFINITT Healthcare" in September 2009. It was listed on KOSDAQ (the Korean stock market) in May 2010.

== Worldwide Facilities ==
INFINITT Healthcare has 10 major global offices (including the headquarters in South Korea, Seoul). Products and Solutions are provided through these global business units and several other international sales distributors.

- INFINITT Taiwan, established 2003
- INFINITT Japan, established 2004
- INFINITT China, established 2004
- INFINITT North America, established 2005
- INFINITT Europe, established 2009
- INFINITT South East Asia, established 2009
- INFINITT United Kingdom, established 2010
- INFINITT Middle East Africa, established 2011
- INFINITT Brazil, established 2011
- INFINITT Indonesia, established 2014

== Products ==
INFINITT Healthcare's products include:

- Imaging technology and viewers for radiology, cardiology, radiation oncology, dentistry and mammography
- 3D and advanced visualization software for all major medical departments
- Clinical Information Systems
- Dose monitoring system
- Vendor neutral archive (VNA) technology
- Cloud-based and tele-radiology services
- Consulting, remote monitoring and data migration services
