= Ambra Health =

American software company

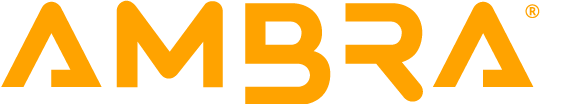
- Industry: Healthcare; Health information technology Life Sciences
- Founded: 2004
- Headquarters: New York, NY
- Key people: Morris Panner (CEO); Geoff Crawshaw (CTO)
- Products: Medical Image Sharing; Vendor Neutral Archive; Picture & Archiving Communications System; DICOM Viewer
- Website: ambrahealth.com

Ambra Health (formerly DICOM Grid), is a software company that provides solutions for medical image sharing of DICOM and non-DICOM data between patients, physicians, and hospitals.

== History ==
The company was founded as DICOM Grid, Inc. in 2004 to make digital medical imaging on a cloud based platform. DICOM Grid launched their cloud based platform as DG Suite, that allows to store diagnostic imaging and health data in its platform that can be accessed and shared by the healthcare providers and patients. The platform was later approved under the Health Insurance Portability and Accountability Act (HIPAA). It received best in KLAS awards continuously from 2014 to 2017 and also received 2016 SIIA CODiE award.

In September 2016, the company re-branded itself to Ambra Health a DBA of DICOM Grid, Inc. As of 2017, the company claims to have 750 healthcare providers using its platform.

== Products and services ==
- DICOM and non-DICOM image viewer
- Medical Image Sharing
- Image routing
- Vendor Neutral Archive
- Cloud computing based Picture & Archiving Communications System

== Funding ==
- March 2010- $11.88 million
- Nov, 2010- $7.5 million
- May, 2012- $5 million
- July, 2014- $6 million
- Nov, 2015- $3 million
- March, 2016- $6 million
- September, 2016- $6 million

== Partnerships ==
- Athenahealth
- drchrono
- Modernizing Medicine
- Radiological Society of North America
- RSNA Image Share
- CommonWell Health Alliance
