= Invoke Image Display =

Invoke Image Display (IID) is an IHE Integration Profile that simplifies the task of integrating non-image-aware systems like EHRs, EMRs, PHRs, RIS and other information systems with image-aware systems like PACS, VNA and Image Sharing solutions, by providing a standard mechanism to request that imaging studies be displayed.

== Implementation ==
IID defines a simple HTTP GET request that contains in the URL either a patient identifier or a list of study identifiers, and a small set of additional parameters to dictate display behavior.

The profile specifies requirements for the display to provide interactive viewing of a complete set of diagnostic images, if requested. The interactivity required includes windowing, zooming and panning as well as image navigation.

Security is addressed through normal HTTP mechanisms.

The display can take the form of a browser based viewer, a separate applet, plugin or thick client based viewer or even a separate physical machine; the invocation remains the same and is agnostic to the viewer implementation mechanism.

== Specification ==
The profile is defined as part of the IHE Radiology Technical Framework.

== See also ==
- IHE
- PACS
- VNA
- DICOM
