= Enterprise imaging =

Enterprise imaging has been defined as "a set of strategies, initiatives, and workflows implemented across a healthcare enterprise to consistently and optimally capture, index, manage, store, distribute, view, exchange, and analyze all clinical imaging and multimedia content to enhance the electronic health record". The concepts of enterprise imaging are elucidated in a series of papers by members of the HIMSS-SIIM Enterprise Imaging Workgroup.

The use of the term enterprise imaging in this manner is relatively new, having previously been used to describe expanding access to radiology images throughout an enterprise. The concept of expanding PACS to include visible light imaging and other modalities beyond radiology and cardiology dates back to the relatively early days of PACS.

== See also ==
- DICOM
- Digital Photography
- Vendor Neutral Archive
- Medical imaging
- Medical image sharing
- Data governance
- Picture archiving and communication system
- Medical specialty
- Medical photography
- Imaging informatics
