= Medical image sharing =

Electronic exchange of medical images

An image displayed on a medical image sharing platform

Medical image sharing is the electronic exchange of medical images between hospitals, physicians and patients. Rather than using traditional media, such as a CD or DVD, and either shipping it out or having patients carry it with them, technology now allows for the sharing of these images using the cloud. The primary format for images is DICOM (Digital Imaging and Communications in Medicine). Typically, non-image data such as reports may be attached in standard formats like PDF (Portable Document Format) during the sending process. Additionally, there are standards in the industry, such as IHE Cross Enterprise Document Sharing for Imaging (XDS-I), for managing the sharing of documents between healthcare enterprises. A typical architecture involved in setup is a locally installed server, which sits behind the firewall, allowing secure transmissions with outside facilities. In 2009, the Radiological Society of North America launched the "Image Share" project, with the goal of giving patients control of their imaging histories (reports and images) by allowing them to manage these records as they would online banking or shopping.

== Uses ==
- Care Facilities: Institutions use medical image sharing to facilitate transfers between other facilities that may or may not be on the same network. They are also able to instantly send results to referring physicians in the community, as well as directly to patients.
- Physicians: Doctors use the technology to have immediate access to images, as opposed to waiting for physical media to arrive. Having access to a patient's medical history improves the point of care service.
- Patients: In conjunction with recent US government initiatives, patients are able to receive their imaging exams electronically, without needing to carry and store physical media. It allows for the ability to see physicians in multiple locations and have their imaging at the ready.

== Benefits ==
- Improved access to patients’ medical imaging histories
- Ability to view images instantly
- Real-time collaboration by specialists
- Avoiding duplicate care reduces costs
- Decreased radiation exposure for patients
- Expertise and specialized opinion is remotely accessible to patients

== Health ==
Medical Image Sharing contributes to many of the "Health" initiatives across the industry. Being able to instantly and electronically exchange medical information can improve communication between physicians, as well as with patients.

- Meaningful Use: The goal of meaningful use is to promote the spread of electronic health records to improve health care in the United States, which is to be rolled out in 3 stages through 2015. Some benefits of the initiative include better access to medical information and patient empowerment. Medical image sharing helps achieve meaningful use by improving access to medical images to patients and physicians.
- Telehealth: The practice of delivering healthcare services utilizing telecommunication technologies is known as Telehealth. A major goal is to support long-distance health care for patients who are unable to easily travel to the point of care. Patients and professionals are also able to obtain further knowledge on health topics. As a part of the U.S. Department of Health and Human Services, the Office for the Advancement of Telehealth (OAT) promotes the use of telehealth technologies. Sharing medical images over long distances can happen instantaneously with these technologies, allowing a physician to review a patient's images during the conference.
- Patient Engagement: Recent changes in the healthcare industry have placed more emphasis on empowering patients to control and have access to more of their medical information. The use of tools such as Electronic health records will help patients take a more active role in their health. With medical image sharing, patients can receive their medical imaging electronically, and then be able to share that information with the next physician they are seeing.
- Cloud Computing: Using software that is delivered as a service over the internet is referred to as Cloud computing. Typically, medical image sharing will be rolled out as a service for hospitals, clinicians and patients.
- Mobile: The use of mobile electronic devices has been rising across many industries, with healthcare included. As a physician, having access to medical images on the go is an important development in the field.

== Architecture ==
A typical architecture for a medical image sharing platform includes transmitting data from a system installed directly on the hospital network and behind the firewall, to and from an outside entity. Some of the standard architectural pieces involved include:

- Data transmission is the physical transfer of data through a communication channel, such as wires, wireless technologies or physical media. The most common use case for image sharing would be transmitting the image files using the cloud, allowing for instant access and exchange with anyone, anywhere. A Virtual private network (VPN) can be set up to enable exchange, but this is typically requires more to maintain for the facilities involved.
- Data compression is used to help facilitate the exchange of large files by encoding using smaller bits than the original version. This process helps reduce the resources being used and improves the transmission capabilities.
- Security: One widely utilized security tool is TSL/SSL, or Transport Layer Security. The Transport Layer Security (TLS)/Secure Sockets Layer (SSLv3) is used to secure electronic communications. TLS/SSLv3 helps to secure transmitted data using encryption. TLS/SSLv3 authenticates clients to prove the identities of parties engaged in secure communication, as well as authenticates servers. The TLS/SSLv3 security protocol can protect against data disclosure, masquerade attacks, bucket brigade attacks, rollback attacks, and replay attacks.
- Data Centers: A Data center is used to house computer systems and associated pieces. The main use of these facilities in medical image sharing is to provide backup. The infrastructure commonly includes redundant power, redundant generators, redundant Internet connections, redundant firewalls, redundant network switches, and redundant storage. This is a vital piece to ensure that medical images are safe and secure in the cloud.

== Integrations ==
Image sharing platforms can integrate directly with many hospital systems, such as:

- Active Directory - Link to a hospital Active Directory for seamless use by staffed physicians.
- Picture archiving and communication system (PACS) - A medical imaging technology that provides economical storage of, and convenient access to, images from multiple modalities within a facility.
- Electronic medical record (EMR) - A computerized medical record created in an organization that delivers care, such as a hospital or physician's office.
- Vendor Neutral Archive (VNA) - A medical imaging technology in which images and documents (and potentially any file of clinical relevance) are stored (archived) in a standard format with a standard interface, such that they can be accessed in a vendor-neutral manner by other systems.
- Decision support system - A computer-based information system that supports business or organizational decision-making activities.
- Health information exchange (HIE) - The mobilization of healthcare information electronically across organizations within a region, community or hospital system.
- Personal health record (PHR) - A health record where health data and information related to the care of a patient is maintained by the patient.

== Standards ==
- DICOM - A standard for handling, storing, printing, and transmitting information in medical imaging.
- Cross Enterprise Document Sharing (XDS) - Focused on providing a standards-based specification for managing the sharing of documents between any healthcare enterprise, ranging from a private physician office to a clinic to an acute care in-patient facility and personal health record systems.
- Cross-enterprise Document Sharing for Imaging (XDS-I) - Extends XDS to share images, diagnostic reports and related information across a group of care sites.
- HL7

== Privacy ==
- Health Insurance Portability and Accountability Act (HIPAA) - Enacted by the United States Congress and signed by President Bill Clinton in 1996. Title II of HIPAA, known as the Administrative Simplification (AS) provisions, requires the establishment of national standards for electronic health care transactions and national identifiers for providers, health insurance plans, and employers.

== Government Initiatives ==
- HITECH Act: The Health Information Technology for Economic and Clinical Health (HITECH) Act was instituted on February 17, 2009, in hopes of raising the overall meaningful use of health IT. It was created as a part of the American Recovery and Reinvestment Act of 2009. It also addressed security and privacy issues related to electronic exchange of medical information.
- Blue Button: A patient is provided with a highly visible, clickable button to download his or her medical records in digital form from a secure website offered by their doctors, insurers, pharmacies or other health-related service. People can log into this secure website to view and have the option to download their health information, so they can examine it, check it, and share it with their doctors and others as they see fit. The Blue Button download capability is a tool that can help individuals get access to their information so they can more effectively participate in and manage their health and health care. It is mainly being used by the Department of Veteran Affairs in the United States.

== RSNA Image Share Project ==
RSNA Image Share is a network created to enable radiologists to share medical images with patients using personal health record (PHR) accounts. This pilot project, funded by the National Institute for Biomedical Imaging and Bioengineering (Nibib) and administered by RSNA, began enrolling patients in 2011.

Currently, there are five participating medical centers in the program - Mount Sinai Hospital, New York, UCSF Medical Center, University of Maryland Medical Center, University of Chicago Medical Center, and Mayo Clinic. Patients at these sites are able to receive and access their medical images electronically. As of January 2017, there were seven software companies who have completed the RSNA Image Share Validation, Agfa Healthcare, Ambra Health (formerly DICOM Grid), GE Healthcare, Lexmark Healthcare, LifeImage, Inc., Mach7 Technologies and Novarad.

There are three main architectural pieces to the project:

1. A clearinghouse in the cloud
2. An Edge Server at each local radiology site
3. A PHR to receive the images and reports

== See also ==
- Medical imaging
- DICOM
- Medical software
- Telemedicine
- Electronic health record (EHR)
- Radiology
- Radiology Information System
- Electronic Medical Record (EMR)
- Vendor Neutral Archive (VNA)
- Picture Archiving & Communications System (PACS)
- Imaging Informatics
- Cloud computing
