= Health information technology =

Information technology applied to health and health care

Health information technology (HIT) is health technology, particularly information technology, applied to health and health care. It supports health information management across computerized systems and the secure exchange of health information between consumers, providers, payers, and quality monitors. Based on a 2008 report on a small series of studies conducted at four sites that provide ambulatory care – three U.S. medical centers and one in the Netherlands, the use of electronic health records (EHRs) was viewed as the most promising tool for improving the overall quality, safety and efficiency of the health delivery system.

== Risk-based regulatory framework for health IT ==
On September 4, 2013, the Health IT Policy Committee (HITPC) accepted and approved recommendations from the Food and Drug Administration Safety and Innovation Act (FDASIA) working group for a risk-based regulatory framework for health information technology. The Food and Drug Administration (FDA), the Office of the National Coordinator for Health IT (ONC), and Federal Communications Commission (FCC) kicked off the FDASIA workgroup of the HITPC to provide stakeholder input into a report on a risk-based regulatory framework that promotes safety and innovation and reduces regulatory duplication, consistent with section 618 of FDASIA. This provision permitted the Secretary of Health and Human Services (HHS) to form a workgroup in order to obtain broad stakeholder input from across the health care, IT, patients and innovation spectrum. The FDA, ONC, and FCC actively participated in these discussions with stakeholders from across the health care, IT, patients and innovation spectrum.

HIMSS Good Informatics Practices-GIP is aligned with FDA risk-based regulatory framework for health information technology. GIP development began in 2004 developing risk-based IT technical guidance. Today, the GIP peer-review and published modules are widely used as a tool for educating Health IT professionals.

Interoperable HIT will improve individual patient care, but it will also bring many public health benefits including:

- early detection of infectious disease outbreaks around the country;
- improved tracking of chronic disease management;
- evaluation of health care based on value enabled by the collection of de-identified price and quality information that can be compared

According to an article published in the International Journal of Medical Informatics, health information sharing between patients and providers helps to improve diagnosis, promotes self care, and patients also know more information about their health. The use of electronic medical records (EMRs) is still scarce now but is increasing in Canada, American and British primary care. Healthcare information in EMRs are important sources for clinical, research, and policy questions. Health information privacy (HIP) and security has been a big concern for patients and providers. Studies in Europe evaluating electronic health information poses a threat to electronic medical records and exchange of personal information. Moreover, software's traceability features allow the hospitals to collect detailed information about the preparations dispensed, creating a database of every treatment that can be used for research purposes.

== Concepts and definitions ==
Health information technology (HIT) is "the application of information processing involving both computer hardware and software that deals with the storage, retrieval, sharing, and use of health care information, health data, and knowledge for communication and decision making". Technology is a broad concept that deals with a species' usage and knowledge of tools and crafts, and how it affects a species' ability to control and adapt to its environment. However, a strict definition is elusive; "technology" can refer to material objects of use to humanity, such as machines, hardware, or utensils, but can also encompass broader themes, including systems, methods of organization, and techniques. For HIT, technology represents computers and communications attributes that can be networked to build systems for moving health information. Informatics is yet another integral aspect of HIT.

Informatics refers to the science of information, the practice of information processing, and the engineering of information systems. Informatics underlies the academic investigation and practitioner application of computing and communications technology to healthcare, health education, and biomedical research. Health informatics refers to the intersection of information science, computer science, and health care. Health informatics describes the use and sharing of information within the healthcare industry with contributions from computer science, mathematics, and psychology. It deals with the resources, devices, and methods required for optimizing the acquisition, storage, retrieval, and use of information in health and biomedicine. Health informatics tools include not only computers but also clinical guidelines, formal medical terminologies, and information and communication systems. Medical informatics, nursing informatics, public health informatics, pharmacy informatics, and translational bioinformatics are subdisciplines that inform health informatics from different disciplinary perspectives. The processes and people of concern or study are the main variables.

== Implementation ==
The Institute of Medicine's (2001) call for the use of electronic prescribing systems in all healthcare organizations by 2010 heightened the urgency to accelerate United States hospitals' adoption of CPOE systems. In 2004, President Bush signed an Executive Order titled the President's Health Information Technology Plan, which established a ten-year plan to develop and implement electronic medical record systems across the US to improve the efficiency and safety of care. According to a study by RAND Health, the US healthcare system could save more than $81 billion annually, reduce adverse healthcare events and improve the quality of care if it were to widely adopt health information technology.

The American Recovery and Reinvestment Act, signed into law in 2009 under the Obama administration, has provided approximately $19 billion in incentives for hospitals to shift from paper to electronic medical records. Meaningful Use, as a part of the 2009 Health Information Technology for Economic and Clinical Health Act (HITECH) was the incentive that included over $20 billion for the implementation of HIT alone, and provided further indication of the growing consensus regarding the potential salutary effect of HIT. The American Recovery and Reinvestment Act has set aside $2 billion which will go towards programs developed by the National Coordinator and Secretary to help healthcare providers implement HIT and provide technical assistance through various regional centers. The other $17 billion in incentives comes from Medicare and Medicaid funding for those who adopt HIT before 2015. Healthcare providers who implement electronic records can receive up to $44,000 over four years in Medicare funding and $63,750 over six years in Medicaid funding. The sooner that healthcare providers adopt the system, the more funding they receive. Those who do not adopt electronic health record systems before 2015 do not receive any federal funding.

While electronic health records have potentially many advantages in terms of providing efficient and safe care, recent reports have brought to light some challenges with implementing electronic health records. The most immediate barriers for widespread adoption of this technology have been the high initial cost of implementing the new technology and the time required for doctors to train and adapt to the new system. There have also been suspected cases of fraudulent billing, where hospitals inflate their billings to Medicare. Given that healthcare providers have not reached the deadline (2015) for adopting electronic health records, it is unclear what effects this policy will have long term.

One approach to reducing the costs and promoting wider use is to develop open standards related to EHRs. In 2014 there was widespread interest in a new HL7 draft standard, Fast Healthcare Interoperability Resources (FHIR), which is designed to be open, extensible, and easier to implement, benefiting from modern web technologies.

== Types of technology ==
In a 2008 study about the adoption of technology in the United States, Furukawa and colleagues classified applications for prescribing to include electronic medical records (EMR), clinical decision support (CDS), and computerized physician order entry (CPOE). They further defined applications for dispensing to include bar-coding at medication dispensing (BarD), robot for medication dispensing (ROBOT), and automated dispensing machines (ADM). They defined applications for administration to include electronic medication administration records (eMAR) and bar-coding at medication administration (BarA or BCMA). Other types include Health information exchange.

=== Electronic health record (EHR) ===
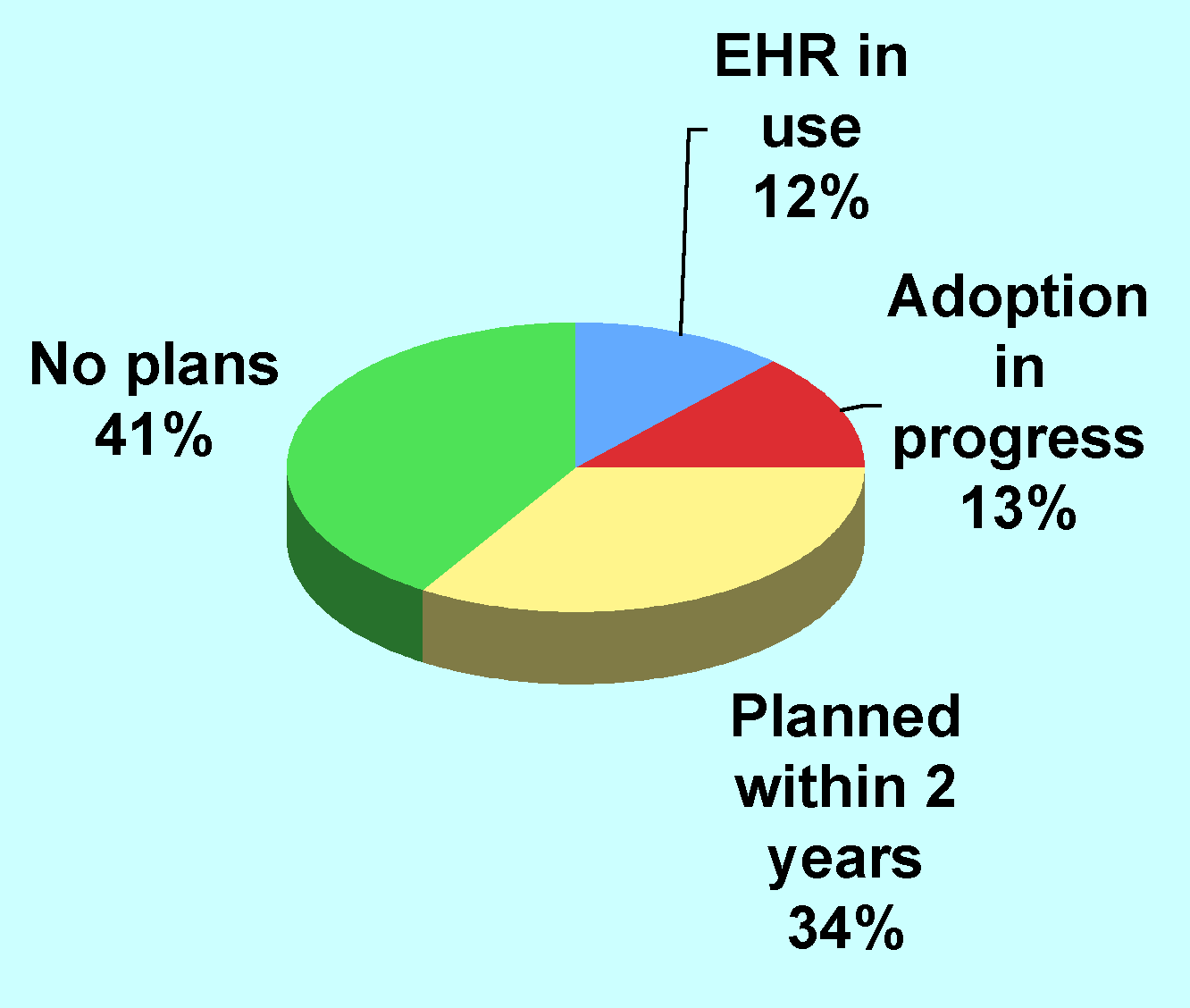
US medical groups' adoption of EHR (2005)

Although the electronic health record (EHR), previously known as the electronic medical record (EMR), is frequently cited in the literature, there is no consensus about the definition. However, there is consensus that EMRs can reduce several types of errors, including those related to prescription drugs, to preventive care, and to tests and procedures. Recurring alerts remind clinicians of intervals for preventive care and track referrals and test results. Clinical guidelines for disease management have a demonstrated benefit when accessible within the electronic record during the process of treating the patient. Advances in health informatics and widespread adoption of interoperable electronic health records promise access to a patient's records at any health care site. A 2005 report noted that medical practices in the United States are encountering barriers to adopting an EHR system, such as training, costs and complexity, but the adoption rate continues to rise (see chart to right). Since 2002, the National Health Service of the United Kingdom has placed emphasis on introducing computers into healthcare. As of 2005, one of the largest projects for a national EHR is by the National Health Service (NHS) in the United Kingdom. The goal of the NHS is to have 60,000,000 patients with a centralized electronic health record by 2010. The plan involves a gradual roll-out commencing May 2006, providing general practices in England access to the National Programme for IT (NPfIT), the NHS component of which is known as the "Connecting for Health Programme". However, recent surveys have shown physicians' deficiencies in understanding the patient safety features of the NPfIT-approved software.

A main problem in HIT adoption is mainly seen by physicians, an important stakeholder to the process of EHR. The Thorn et al. article, elicited that emergency physicians noticed that health information exchange disrupted workflow and was less desirable to use, even though the main goal of EHR is improving coordination of care. The problem was seen that exchanges did not address the needs of end users, e.g., simplicity, user-friendly interface, and speed of systems. The same finding was seen in an earlier article with the focus on CPOE and physician resistance to its use, Bhattacherjee et al.

One opportunity for EHRs is to utilize natural language processing for searches. One systematic review of the literature found that searching and analyzing notes and text that would otherwise be inaccessible for review could be accessed through increasing collaboration between software developers and end-users of natural language processing tools within EHRs.

=== Clinical point of care technology ===
==== Computerized provider (physician) order entry ====
Prescribing errors are the largest identified source of preventable errors in hospitals. A 2006 report by the Institute of Medicine estimated that a hospitalized patient is exposed to a medication error each day of his or her stay. Computerized provider order entry (CPOE), also called computerized physician order entry, can reduce total medication error rates by 80%, and adverse (serious with harm to patient) errors by 55%. A 2004 survey by found that 16% of US clinics, hospitals and medical practices are expected to be utilizing CPOE within 2 years. In addition to electronic prescribing, a standardized bar code system for dispensing drugs could prevent a quarter of drug errors. Consumer information about the risks of the drugs and improved drug packaging (clear labels, avoiding similar drug names and dosage reminders) are other error-proofing measures. Despite ample evidence of the potential to reduce medication errors, competing systems of barcoding and electronic prescribing have slowed adoption of this technology by doctors and hospitals in the United States, due to concern with interoperability and compliance with future national standards. Such concerns are not inconsequential; standards for electronic prescribing for Medicare Part D conflict with regulations in many US states. And, aside from regulatory concerns, for the small-practice physician, utilizing CPOE requires a major change in practice work flow and an additional investment of time. Many physicians are not full-time hospital staff; entering orders for their hospitalized patients means taking time away from scheduled patients.

== Technological innovations, opportunities, and challenges ==
Handwritten reports or notes, manual order entry, non-standard abbreviations, and poor legibility lead to substantial errors and injuries, according to the Institute of Medicine (2000) report. The follow-up IOM (2004) report, Crossing the quality chasm: A new health system for the 21st century, advised rapid adoption of electronic patient records, electronic medication ordering, with computer- and internet-based information systems to support clinical decisions. However, many system implementations have experienced costly failures. Furthermore, there is evidence that CPOE may actually contribute to some types of adverse events and other medical errors. For example, the period immediately following CPOE implementation resulted in significant increases in reported adverse drug events in at least one study, and evidence of other errors have been reported. Collectively, these reported adverse events describe phenomena related to the disruption of the complex adaptive system resulting from poorly implemented or inadequately planned technological innovation.

=== Technological iatrogenesis ===
Technology may introduce new sources of error. Technologically induced errors are significant and increasingly more evident in care delivery systems. Terms to describe this new area of error production include the label technological iatrogenesis for the process and e-iatrogenic for the individual error. The sources for these errors include:

- prescriber and staff inexperience may lead to a false sense of security; that when technology suggests a course of action, errors are avoided.
- shortcut or default selections can override non-standard medication regimens for elderly or underweight patients, resulting in toxic doses.
- CPOE and automated drug dispensing were identified as a cause of error by 84% of over 500 health care facilities participating in a surveillance system by the United States Pharmacopoeia.
- irrelevant or frequent warnings can interrupt work flow

Healthcare information technology can also result in iatrogenesis if design and engineering are substandard, as illustrated in a 14-part detailed analysis done at the University of Sydney. Numerous examples of bias introduced by artificial intelligence (AI) have been cited as the use of AI-assisted healthcare increases. See Algorithmic bias.

== Revenue Cycle HIT ==
The HIMSS Revenue Cycle Improvement Task Force was formed to prepare for the IT changes in the U.S. (e.g. the American Recovery and Reinvestment Act of 2009 (HITECH), Affordable Care Act, 5010 (electronic exchanges), ICD-10). An important change to the revenue cycle is the international classification of diseases (ICD) codes from 9 to 10. ICD-9 codes are set up to use three to five alphanumeric codes that represent 4,000 different types of procedures, while ICD-10 uses three to seven alphanumeric codes increasing procedural codes to 70,000. ICD-9 was outdated because there were more procedures than codes available, and to document for procedures without an ICD-9 code, unspecified codes were utilized which did not fully capture the procedures or the work involved in turn affecting reimbursement. Hence, ICD-10 was introduced to simplify the procedures with unknown codes and unify the standards closer to world standards (ICD-11). One of the main parts of Revenue Cycle HIT is charge capture, it utilizes codes to capture costs for reimbursements from different payers, such as CMS.

== International comparisons through HIT ==
International health system performance comparisons are important for understanding health system complexities and finding better opportunities, which can be done through health information technology. It gives policy makers the chance to compare and contrast the systems through established indicators from health information technology, as inaccurate comparisons can lead to adverse policies.

== See also ==
- Artificial intelligence in healthcare
- Bioinformatics
- Clinical documentation improvement
- Computer security § Medical systems
- Consumer health informatics
- eHealth
- European Institute for Health Records (EuroRec)
- Health data
- Hospital information system
- Imaging informatics
- List of open source healthcare software
- Medical imaging
- mHealth
- Patient safety
- Patient tracking system
- Personal health record
- Information technology
- Picture archiving and communication system
- Radiology information system
- Software programs for pharmacy workflow management
- Computer science
