= Health informatics in China =

Health informatics in China (Chinese: 医学信息学) is about the health informatics or medical informatics or healthcare information system/technology in China.

The main review and assessment of health informatics in China for the WHO-Health Metrics Network was conducted in 2006 which details Provincial assessments, developing strategic plan outline, improving community health monitoring system, household surveys, routine health statistics system.

Due to the Health Informatization Development Plan, all hospitals are required to increase investment in building digitized hospitals. This requirement is expected to accelerate the growth of China's HIT market by about 25 to 30% a year during 2006–2010.

By the end of 2006, China's investment in its healthcare information systems (HIS) had increased by nearly 16 percent to RMB 5.8 billion, year-on-year. This amount accounts for approximately 0.5% of the country's total healthcare expenditures of RMB 866 billion during the same period.

The market size is expected to expand to approximately RMB 15 billion in 2010. The development of China's HIT industry is generally considered to be at a preliminary stage, resembling that of western countries 20 years ago. However, as China learns more about available and emerging technologies, it now has the opportunity to leapfrog ahead.

== Healthcare overview ==
China spent $97 billion, or 5.5% of its GDP, on healthcare in 2004. As previously stated, public spending on healthcare remains low; public spending in 2004 accounted for only 17% of total healthcare expenditure while out-of-pocket expenses reached 53.6%.

About 130 million people are covered under the National Social Insurance Program for Urban Employees, a program established in 2005. Another 50 million people are covered through government insurance. Yet less than 30% of China's population has medical insurance. Indeed, over 35% of the urban population and 50% of people in rural areas have no coverage at all.

China's current healthcare system is primarily composed of large public hospitals, supplemented by a small number of private, for-profit hospitals. As of 2005, there were 18,703 hospitals in China. Among them, 2,027 were private hospitals (10.83%). Chinese hospitals can be divided into three categories: general hospitals (70%), traditional Chinese medicine (TCM) hospitals (14%), and specialty hospitals (16%).

In addition, China has 5,895 outpatient facilities: 1,266 outpatient facilities and 541 traditional medicine facilities. As of 2005 China had 1,938,272 registered doctors who are primarily employed by hospitals.

== History ==
The reform and opening up in the early 1980s resulted in major changes in China's healthcare system, especially as a result of the dismantling of the rural cooperative medical system. After being given considerable financial independence, hospitals began to generate the majority of their income through user fees, a practice that continues today. Healthcare is now provided on a fee-for-service basis. The pricing structure attempts to facilitate equity by providing basic care below cost, with profits reaped through the (often excessive) sale of drugs and high-technology services; this structure leads to inefficiency and inappropriate patient care. Healthcare insurance coverage in China is low, with less than 30% of the population receiving any medical insurance.

China's health information technology HIT development has a brief history. Development commenced in the mid-1990s with financial management systems; only in the last five years or so have clinical systems been implemented. China has made progress in a relatively short time period, but weak application software and a scarcity of implementation skills delay further progress. Most Chinese hospitals are attempting to dramatically improve and extensively digitize their work processes in the near future.

=== Project on Construction of National Public Health Information System ===
The work group of the Ministry of Health for information construction has drafted the Project on Construction of National Public Health Information System. The "Project" confirmed the guideline, objectives and principles of public health information system construction, proposed framework for further actions. On September 17, 2003, information construction workgroup of the Ministry of Health held a Meeting via television and telephone on construction of public health information system in China. The agenda included a work report in the field of information construction of the Ministry of Health, the introduction of Construction Project of the National Public Health Information System (Draft) and a report from the National Center of Disease Control on relevant requirements of SARS report system via network.

=== Mortality statistics ===
As part of a major revamp of its health information system, China is merging two systems for collecting mortality data to gain a more accurate picture of how many people die and why. Cause-of-death data are playing an increasingly important role in the public health policy of China. Recently, Chinese Center for Disease Control and Prevention took part in a research project led by the Center for Statistics of the Ministry of Health on the disease burden and long-term health problems in China; the results were dramatic.

== HIT Adoption ==
Health information technology is now entering its second software generation in China, and IT usage in hospitals resembles that of the late 1970s in the United States. Most hospitals in China incorporate IT software into their payment and billing systems, and many have also begun integrating IT into clinical systems in the past five years.

The use of IT in clinical systems has emerged on a departmental basis. As a result of inexperience with IT infrastructure, however, hospitals have encountered several obstacles. Fragmentation, duplicative systems, and poor integration between diverse software systems have created "information islands" that impede data sharing.

Three valuable lessons are evident from China's HIT development over the past ten years:

- Medical information should be integrated across all departments in the hospital. Poor integration of diverse software systems within hospitals impedes inter-hospital information exchanges and creates problems as IT use expands.
- In order for IT systems to benefit clinical services and hospital management, effective overall IT planning is necessary. Oversimplification of IT planning and a lack of clinician engagement have in the recent past led to poor return on investment (ROI) in HIT.
- Implementation requires not only strong project-management skills but also attention to end-user requirements and needs as well as to work processes re-engineering. Poor implementation has resulted in a large amount of work-process redundancy.

=== Government policy ===
The Chinese government adopted an "informatization" approach in the 1990s, promoting IT development in all major industries, including the health sector, with one goal being to bridge the information divide. HIT policy began in 1995 with the "Golden Health Project," which sought to create the foundation for electronically linking health administration departments and hospitals as well as medical education and research institutes. Government efforts in the 21st century increasingly focus on health IT. For example, the 2003–2010 Ministry of Health Guidelines for HIT Development in China call for the introduction of EHRs and regional health information networks to be implemented throughout the country. Many hospitals are considering system-wide upgrades, and larger budgets are more readily available for these kinds of investments.

=== Organizations ===
The Ministry of Health within the government and independent hospital administrators are the primary drivers of HIT adoption in China. Following the SARS epidemic, the Chinese government realized the importance of integrating an effective IT infrastructure into the country's health system. Additionally, after a decade of small investments in IT systems hospital leaders have become aware that IT can improve work processes and increase management efficiency.

Many other associations involved in HIT exist in China, including the

- National Medical Information Education (NMIE),
- Association of Chinese Health Informatics,
- Chinese Health Information Association, and
- Chinese Hospital Information Management Association (CHIMA). CHIMA is a branch of the Chinese Hospital Association, a nonprofit national industry and academic association focused on Health IT (similar to the AMIA in the United States).

=== Funding ===
Provincial and local governments in China are the primary funders for regional health information networks and HIT in public hospitals. The national government facilitates investigation of standards and IT infrastructure development. Hospitals invest their own funds into clinical and institutional HIT systems. As of 2006, China spends a little over 0.7% ($700 million) of its national health budget on HIT. Of these funds: 70% goes toward hardware, 20% toward software, and 10% toward services.

=== Planning ===
Spending on healthcare in China will grow dramatically over the next five years, potentially rising to 7% of GDP. HIT spending in China will likely grow even faster, with China's national goal to create EHR and regional health information networks throughout China. Major IT upgrades are now being considered in many hospitals. The focus of future HIT development in China includes the following:

- Electronic health records
- Regional health information networks to share electronic health data
- Better integration of diverse systems within individual hospitals, including agreement upon standards to support IT progress, and better management of change so that the new IT systems will make Chinese hospitals operate more efficiently. In order to accomplish these objectives over the next several years, hospitals will involve experts for IT planning and implementation of the new systems.

=== Challenges ===
Issue	Description
Chinese software in its infancy	Chinese hospital application software currently has limited capabilities, and Chinese software vendors are not as experienced in healthcare applications as foreign vendors. Proven products for clinical information systems do not yet exist.
Lack of skilled HIT professionals	Skilled workers with IT and healthcare and hospital management knowledge are lacking in China.
Lack of strong change management expertise	Strong change-management expertise is missing in China. The great challenge facing many Chinese hospitals is that they have limited experience to manage the changes after implementing major IT systems. Thus, many hospital leaders are hesitant to increase IT investment.
Shenzhen Regional Health Information Network (RHIN)	The Chinese government established as a national goal the implementation of a series of RHINs supported by digital hospitals throughout the country by 2010. The Ministry of Health selected the city of Shenzhen as a pilot site for the development of these RHINs.
Chinese CDC surveillance system	Responding to a request by the Ministry of Health in 2003, the Chinese CDC created a national web-based surveillance system for 37 communicable diseases to receive direct reporting from the majority of hospitals at the county level and above and from more than half of hospitals and clinics at the township level.
Lack of strong change management expertise	Shenzhen will support this RHIN by digitizing all of its hospitals, thus creating more efficient work processes and better management systems to improve healthcare delivery. The Ministry of Health hopes that the Shenzhen RHIN will become a model of what can be done in all across China.

== Hospital information system ==
Progress of the Hospital information system (HIS) in China has made significant progress in recent years. HIS has played a very important role in health care, and the construction and deployment of HIS can improve the efficiency and quality of healthcare work. But the development of HIS in China is unbalanced and there are many problems such as nonstandard hospital management, poor standardization, and lack of consolidation of software development. As a consequence, the current HIS is not able to meet the needs of reform in China's healthcare system. In the future, for the sake of medical information sharing, telemedicine, hospital efficiency enhancement, integration.

In recent years, Hospital Information System (HIS) has been developed in several areas. Many hospitals have constructed HIS. According to the Ministry of Health in 2004, there were 6,063 hospitals out of 15,924 that had established hospital information systems. It is estimated that about 70% of county-level hospitals and above have constructed HIS by mid-2007.

In 2004, the total cost for information technology (IT) in health sector was estimated at approximately RMB 3.5 billions (US$423.5 million), which increased 25% compared with 2003. Most of the resources were committed to HIS. Construction of HIS has taken good effect, which changed the style of hospital management, offered tremendous opportunities to reduce clinical errors (e.g. medication errors, diagnostic errors), to support health care professionals (e.g. availability of timely, up-to-date patient information), to increase the efficiency of care (e.g. less waiting times for patients), or even to improve the quality of patient care. Today, HIS is not only a symbol of modern management, but also one of core competence of a hospital.

Nowadays, with reform in healthcare system and the entry into WTO, HISs is confronting many challenges in China. Medical domain will develop into standardization and internationalization, which stimulate different grade hospitals and many related organizations (e.g. insurance agents, finance organizations, community station), into a big integer. But the forepart HIS didn't consider medical information standards, and can't share medical information.

=== Current status ===
Computers began to be used in hospitals in China in the 1970s, but used as hospital information management since 1984. According to the contents, styles and scopes, HIS in China experienced four phases. They are as follows:

1. Stand-alone. Mostly used in out-patients charge, in-patient charge and drug warehouse management during the late 1970s and early 1980s.
2. Department local area network. Representative applications are inpatient management; outpatient charge and drug deliver system, and drug management system.
3. Integrity of hospital information system. Many big hospital constructed integrity hospital information system on ethernet over 100m since the early 1990s.
4. Telemedicine. With the development of IT and network, many big hospitals commenced to study

implement telemedicine, through which the diagnostic digital images such as CT scans, MRIs and ultrasound CT can be transmitted.

The first three phases focus on hospital information management and the fourth phase patient-centered.

In general, construction of HIS in China has made significant progress since the 1990s. According to some sample investigation about HIS, there are many characters as follows: the development of HIS are imbalanced, the differences among different regions are very significant. In more developed regions, the proportion of hospitals with HIS is high, and the level of HIS is also high, most of them are in the third phase, and a few hospitals are in fourth phase.

In fact, the HIS in many hospitals is no worse than that in advanced foreign hospitals. On the other hand, the level of HIS in developing regions is low, the proportion of hospitals with HIS is also low, and most of them are in the second phase. But the potential market of HIS is very good. By 2004, the proportion of hospitals with HIS in East China was above 80%, whereas, it was less than 20% in Northwest China.

=== "No. 1 Military Project" ===
"No. 1 Military Project" was important in China's HIS development. This project is a hospital information system consisting of over 30 basic subsystems. It was developed by General Logistics Department of PLA collaborating with Hewlett-Packard in 1997. The project has achieved success and improved the development of health informatics in China. So far, over 200 hospitals have adopted this system. This kind of HIS has become a succeeded and advanced representative one in China. The HIS of "No. 1 Military Project" was applied in Xiaotangshan hospital during the outbreak of SARS in 2003. The patients suffered SARS were treated and the system played an important role and was praised highly by specialists.

Although construction of HIS has achieved greatly, yet most HIS concentrates more on the fiscal operations of a hospital and the administrative aspects. Only 10% of hospitals with HIS have developed patient-centered Clinical Information System, while 5% are constructing Picture Archiving and Communication System.

=== Main problems ===
Although there has been good progress during last two decades, especially during last 10 years, there have been many problems which limit further progress. The main problems are as follows.

==== Lack of Standardization/Interoperability ====
Hospital information relate to medical treatment, education, medical research, personnel, money, and substance, et al. Unification of the titles, the concept, the classification and the codes are the basic precondition for information interchange. But the most difficulty is that the standards are not unified. For example, the titles and codes of the case reports, drugs, personnel, equipment, inspection and examination differ in different hospitals. The definition, description and practice operation for the same thing are different. Owing to without unified and authoritative hospital standardization data dictionaries, as well as different HIS developed by different companies with different codes and standards, two bad results come into being. The first one is that every hospital has to develop consumer dictionary, which result in tremendous waste of personnel, money, substance and time. The second one is that standards and user dictionaries are established differently, which affect the unit into the internet and can't share information. As discussed in the previous section, the HIS of "Np. 1 Military Project" was excellent. Even though, there are many problems in standardization. Results from some researchers’ investigation revealed that 99 code tables should be consistent, but there are only 31 are consistent. Even worse, 27 codes in 27 military hospitals have 27 formats. Using message standards, including the Health Level 7 (HL7), is the precondition to ensure interoperability between different hospitals systems. However most hospitals haven't considered this problem and few HIS apply HL7. Only in some developed regions, such as Guangdong province, the governments require that developers of HIS must adopt or refer to HL7 standard to transmit patient clinical information. The reform in Chinese healthcare system requires different grade hospitals and many related organizations, such as insurance agents, finance organizations, community station, can share and interoperate in-patients’ information. But the poor information standardization in HIS can't meet the need.

==== Unified Layout of Software Systems ====
HIS developments began to accelerate since the early 1990s. All level of health administrations, hospitals and some information development companies invested huge personnel and money into HIS developing. Especially in developed regions such as Beijing, Shanghai, Guangdong, Shandong, Jiangsu, the HIS achieved success and have larger scale. Yet the reasons those without plans as a whole and control for HIS by the related health administrations, without standards to comply with and without surveillance by some related administrations lead to non-normative HIS developing processes. These are two poor results. The first one is that HIS were developed free, the software had no standards, the developed platform therefore varied. The second problem is that the HIS develop companies were in different levels, and many of them didn't specialize in HIS develop, they were not familiar with the style of hospital management and workflows, or they only knew some specific hospitals. Furthermore, some companies have the idea of eager for quick success and instant benefit, and only considered the current benefits without long-term investment. Some companies even thought that HIS market had potential, so they made some simple system packages together, and took some measures to deceive the users. All above brought severe negative influence to HIS development.

==== Models of Hospital Management ====
The models of hospitals management have major influences on HIS construction. HIS implementation requires both technical structural and behavioral sense, and development of HIS should be carried out within the context of the development itself. Application with HIS but without studying and absorbing has become one bottle neck for HIS development. Compared with hospitals' directors with MBA diploma in developed countries, who manage the hospitals, most of hospitals directors in China are good medicine experts, however, they aren't familiar with modernization management. They have experience in management methods, but didn't know normative and science management. When constructing HIS in their hospitals, they usually requested the HIS accommodate with their existing management modes in spite of their management modes were nonscientific and unreasonable. Besides the complexity of hospital's management, workflows and circumstances in different hospitals differ very much. To meet the need of the hospitals management, the developers had to act according to actual circumstance, which lead to the HISs can't meet the need of information communication and share because of low currency and commercialization. Good HIS should optimize hospital process, but in many Chinese hospitals, this was not the case, poor hospital process flow compromises the good HIS.

=== National standardization priorities ===
There are many problems in HIS construction in China, among which interoperability is one of the most important. The absence of universal and consistent standards for managing and exchanging clinical and administrative information has been identified as bottleneck to utilize and improve the HIS. Therefore, one of priorities in national standardization actions is to accelerate the development of essential standards for HIS. In fact, after several years of running information systems, health providers recognized that standards were the basis for the information sharing and interoperability. The government of China also realized this problem and has taken efforts to construct the health information platform and network. One hypothesis is that because standardization for health informatics is an authoritative field, in which market mechanism does not work. Also, due to misalignment of incentives, often providers who invest in standardization cannot gain benefit directly, therefore they might prefer to invest in network than in standardization. The government may play a role to stimulate adoption by setting standards. In fact, the government had indeed taken measures to enforce the construction of standardization. In 2003, Ministry of Health released the Development Layout of National Health Informatics (2003–2010).

The layout indicates one of principles of standardization for health informatics: combining adoption of international standards and development of national standards. In the late 2003, the Leading Group for Health Informatics in the Ministry of Health started three projects to solve the problem of lacking health informatics standards, including Chinese National Health Information Framework and Standardization, Basic Data Set Standards of Public Health and Basic Data Set Standardization of Hospital System (CBDSS). CBDSS is one important project of the medical information standardization programs, which would improve information progress of hospital and the whole health system. Chinese Hospital Information Management Association (CHIMA) undertook the task of CBDSS project. The goal of this project is to produce a set of data set standards, which is necessary for HIS. By now, most of this project is completed, 11 subgroups and 1 shared group CBDSS came into being. Since 2003, the government had launched over ten projects related health standardization in succession, and substantial progress was made in standardization of medical information.

=== Dependency theory ===
At present, the majority HISs running in China are Hospital Management Information Systems (HIMIS), and they are not able to share medical images diagnostic information due to the various standards and formats adopted by different manufactures. Now there are HIS, Radiology Information System (RIS), Laboratory Information System (LIS) and Picture Archiving and Communication System (PACS) in many bigger hospitals, each system run independently in most hospitals. With the development of health researches and health standardization, this problem can be solved with HIS. In the future, for the sake of medical information sharing, telemedicine, hospital efficiency enhancement, medical service extension, optimizing the working procedure, HIMIS will develop into patient-centered HIS, all the independent systems including the electronic patient record will realize integration. Furthermore, HIS will shift from supporting health care professionals to patients and consumers, from institution-centered to regional and global health information system with new and strongly extended functionalities and tasks.

== International cooperation ==
=== SGER: Transnational Public Health Informatics Research: US-China Collaboration ===
This public health informatics Small Grant for Exploratory Research is a small-scale, exploratory, high-risk proposal that is potentially transformative in its research collaborations between the US and China. The proposal team is building on the momentum gained from two US-China public health informatics workshops held in Beijing in March 2008. New partnerships are expected to emerge. The outcomes have the potential to transform approaches to public health informatics, not only in US and China, but potentially across the globe, in particular in exploring transnational social networks and taking advantage of the kinds of data collection and integration methodologies and technologies employed by the two countries' public health agencies. It affords the opportunity to provide new and longer-term research and educational programs between US and Chinese institutions and practitioners.

== See also ==
- Clinical Document Architecture
- eHealth
- Electronic health record (EHR) & (EMR)
- HL7
- Health information management (HIM)
- ISO TC 215
- International Medical Informatics Association
- LOINC
- mHealth
- Public health informatics
- Telemedicine
