= Patient tracking system =

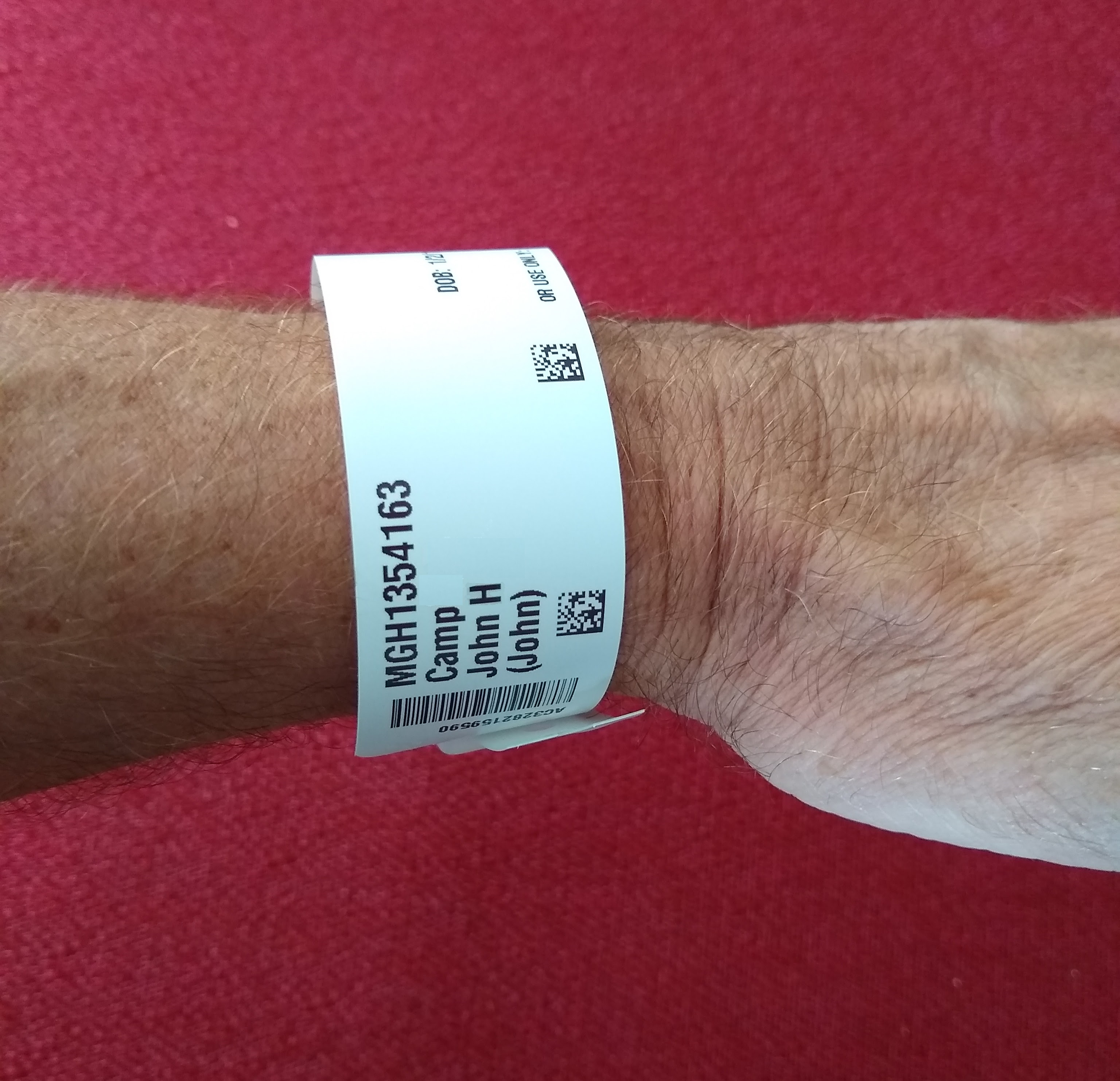
An identification wristband given to a patient at Massachusetts General Hospital.

A patient tracking system (also called patient identification system) allows a healthcare provider to log and monitor the progress of a person through the provision of care during their stay there. Such systems are part of an overall information system and may interact with the person's electronic health record, where information specific to the person is stored, the system used by radiology departments to track patients as well as the system storing medical images, the pathology laboratory information management system, as well as patient check-in and check-out systems.

Increasingly people, as well as biopsies and associated equipment are tagged in various ways, for example with radio-frequency identification tags.

A given floor or ward may use a white board as its system to track the status of all the people being cared for; for example in an obstetrics ward, each mother in labor is listed, along with her status and the time she was last checked.

== See also ==
- Hospital information system
