= National Standardization Administration =

People's Republic of China national standardization body; represented in the ISO and IEC

- 中国国家标准化管理委员会
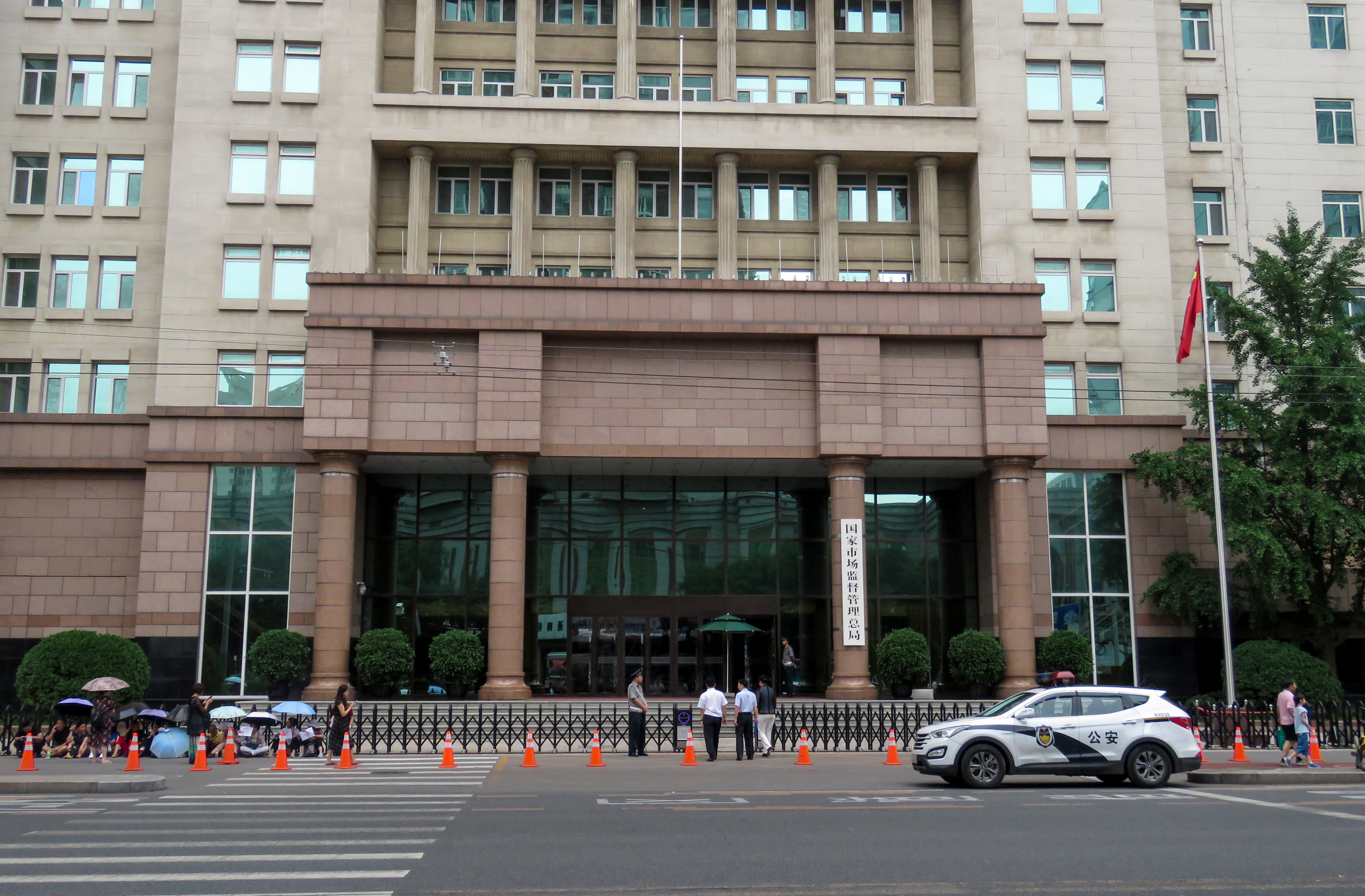

Agency overview
- Formed: October 11, 2001; 24 years ago
- Jurisdiction: China
- Headquarters: 8 Sanlihe East Road, Xicheng, Beijing
- Agency executive: Deng Zhiyong, Director
- Parent agency: State Council
- Website: www.sac.gov.cn

The National Standardization Administration (SAC; Chinese: 中国国家标准化管理委员会; formerly known as the Standardization Administration of China) is an external name of the State Administration for Market Regulation. Prior to 2018, it was an administrative office under the State Council to exercise administrative responsibilities by undertaking unified management, supervision and overall coordination of standardization work in China.

The SAC represents China within the International Organization for Standardization (ISO), the International Electrotechnical Commission (IEC), and other international and regional standardization organizations. The SAC is responsible for organizing the activities of the Chinese National Committee for ISO and IEC; the SAC approves and organizes the implementation of international cooperation and the exchange of projects on standardization.

== History ==
With the development through China's reforms and opening up, in April 2001, the State Council of China decided to set up the General Administration of Quality Supervision, Inspection and Quarantine (AQSIQ), by merging the former CSBTS and the former State Bureau of Import & Export Inspection and Quarantine (CIQ SA) and, at the same time, to establish the Standardization Administration of the People's Republic of China (SAC) and Certification and Accreditation Administration of the People's Republic of China (CNCA) under AQSIQ.

== Related organizations ==
Standards and conformity assessment bodies:

The Ministry of Agriculture and Rural Affairs interfaces with the Food and Agriculture Organization and the Codex Alimentarius Commission.

The State Administration for Market Regulation (SAMR) interfaces with the IOML, the APLMF and the APEC/Sub-Committee on Standards and Conformance (SCSC).

=== Administration of Certification & Accreditation of China ===
Known as the CNCA.

- The International Inspection and Quarantine Standards and Technical Regulations Research Centre interfaces with the WTO-SPS; WTO-TBT
- The National Accreditation Board for Certifiers (CNAB) interfaces with the IAF
- The National Auditor & Training Accreditation Board (CNAT)
- The National Accreditation Board for Laboratories (CNAL) interfaces with the ILAC; APLAC
- The China Quality Certification Center (CQC)
- The China Certification & Inspection Group (CCIC)

=== Standardization Administration of China ===
The SAC interfaces with the IEC, the APEC/SCSC, the JTC 1, the ISO and the PASC.

- China Association For Standardization (CAS)
- China National Institute of Standardization (CNIS)
- Standards Press of China (SPC)
- The National Institute of Metrology (NIM) interfaces with the BIPM and the APMP.

=== Ministry of Industry and Information Technology ===
The Ministry of Industry and Information Technology (MIIT) interfaces with the ITU.

- China Electronics Standardization Institute (CESI)
- China Communications Standards Association (CCSA)
  - National Information Technology Standardization Technical Committee (NITS)
  - China Wireless Telecommunication Standards working Group (CWTS)
- China Standards Information Center (CSSN)
- China Electronics Standardization Association (CESA)

=== Technical ===
- Technical committees
- MII standard workgroups

==== Committees ====
Standardization technical committees

- ISO/IEC/JTC1 National IT Standardization Technical Committee
- IEC/TC82 National Solar Photovoltaic Energy System Standardization Technical Committee
- IEC/TC29 National Magnetic Element and Ferrite Material Standardization Technical Committee
- IEC/TC47 National Semiconductor Device Standardization Technical Committee
- IEC/TC21/SC21A National alkaline battery Standardization Technical Committee
- IEC/TC91 National Printing circuit Standardization Technical Committee
- IEC/TC80 National Navigation Standardization Technical Committee
- IEC/TC25 National technical standardization committee on reliability and maintainability of electronic and electrician products
- IEC/TC29 China National Technical Standardization Committee on Electro-acoustics
- TC47 National Technical Committee on Printed Circuit of Standardization Administration of China

==== National ====
- National Video, Audio and Multimedia system Standardization Technical Committee IEC/TC100
- National All-or-nothing Relay Standardization Technical Committee IEC/TC94
- National high-frequency Cable for Electronics and Connector Standardization Technical Committee IEC/TC46
- National Frequency Control and Selection Standardization Technical Committee IEC/TC49
- National Electronic Tube Bases Standardization Technical Committee IEC/TC39
- National Electromechanical Components for Electronic Equipment Standardization Technical Committee IEC/TC48
- National Electronic equipment Resistor-Capacitor Unit Standardization Technical Committee IEC/TC40
- National Electronic Measuring Instrument Standardization Technical Committee

=== MII standard workgroups ===
- Linux workgroup: Linux 标准工作组
- Database workgroup: 数据库标标准工作组
- AVS workgroup: AVS 标准工作组
- Digital TV workgroup: 数字电视标准工作组
- RFID workgroup: RFID 标准工作组

== Leadership ==
=== Directors ===
| Name | Chinese name | Took office | Left office | Ref. |
|---|---|---|---|---|
| Li Zhonghai | 李忠海 | 2001 | 2005 | |
| Liu Pingjun | 刘平均 | 2005 | 2008 | |
| Ji Zhengkun | 纪正昆 | August 2008 | June 2011 | |
| Chen Gang | 陈刚 | June 2011 | 2013 | |
| Tian Shihong | 田世宏 | 2013 | August 2024 | |
| Deng Zhiyong | 邓志勇 | February 2025 | | |

== See also ==
- Category:Standards
- International Electrotechnical Commission
- Unicode
- Guobiao
- List of GB standards
- China Software Industry Association
- Microsoft YaHei
- Medical informatics in China
- China standard time
- Chinese accounting standards
- China Multimedia Mobile Broadcasting
- China seismic intensity scale
- Time Division-Synchronous Code Division Multiple Access
- WLAN Authentication and Privacy Infrastructure
- Global Open Trunking Architecture
- Personal Handy-phone System
- Compass navigation system
- Taiwan's Chinese National Standards
- Visa policy of the People's Republic of China
