= Medical outsourcing =

Business practice in medicine

Medical outsourcing is a business process used by organizations like hospitals, nursing homes, and healthcare provider practices to obtain physician, nursing, healthcare technician, or other services in a managed services model.

== Physicians ==
Outsourcing of emergency department physicians, as well as radiologists and anesthesiologists in operating rooms, grew rapidly in the United States in the 2000s due a combination of several economic forces, and medical staffing companies developed niche expertise in various medical specialties. Since 2008 a number of Swedish hospitals have used teleradiology services to outsource their emergency night-time radiology to Australia where daytime staff cover Swedish nighttime patients.

Physician outsourcing has led to an increase in the number of people who received catastrophically large medical bills due to the outsourced physicians billing at out of network rates. A doctor in Tampa Bay claimed in 2015 that an emergency department she was staffing while working for a division of Envision Healthcare had chronically purchased the services of too few doctors, leading to excessive waiting times there.

== Nurses ==
Some organizations have used outsourcing through nursing agencies or other medical staffing agencies to deal with the nursing shortage and as a way to save money.

== Management functions ==
Some small practices have outsourced business functions to management services organizations.

Hospitals and medical centers also outsource revenue cycle management functions and real estate management.

== Medical tourism ==
People needing or wanting healthcare sometimes make decisions to seek care in a different jurisdiction; the decision may be based on lack of quality, availability, or legality in the person's home jurisdiction, or it may be a business decision based on the cost of acquiring the care. This form of medical outsourcing on the consumer side is generally called medical tourism.
