= Teleradiology =

Transmission and reading of radiological images

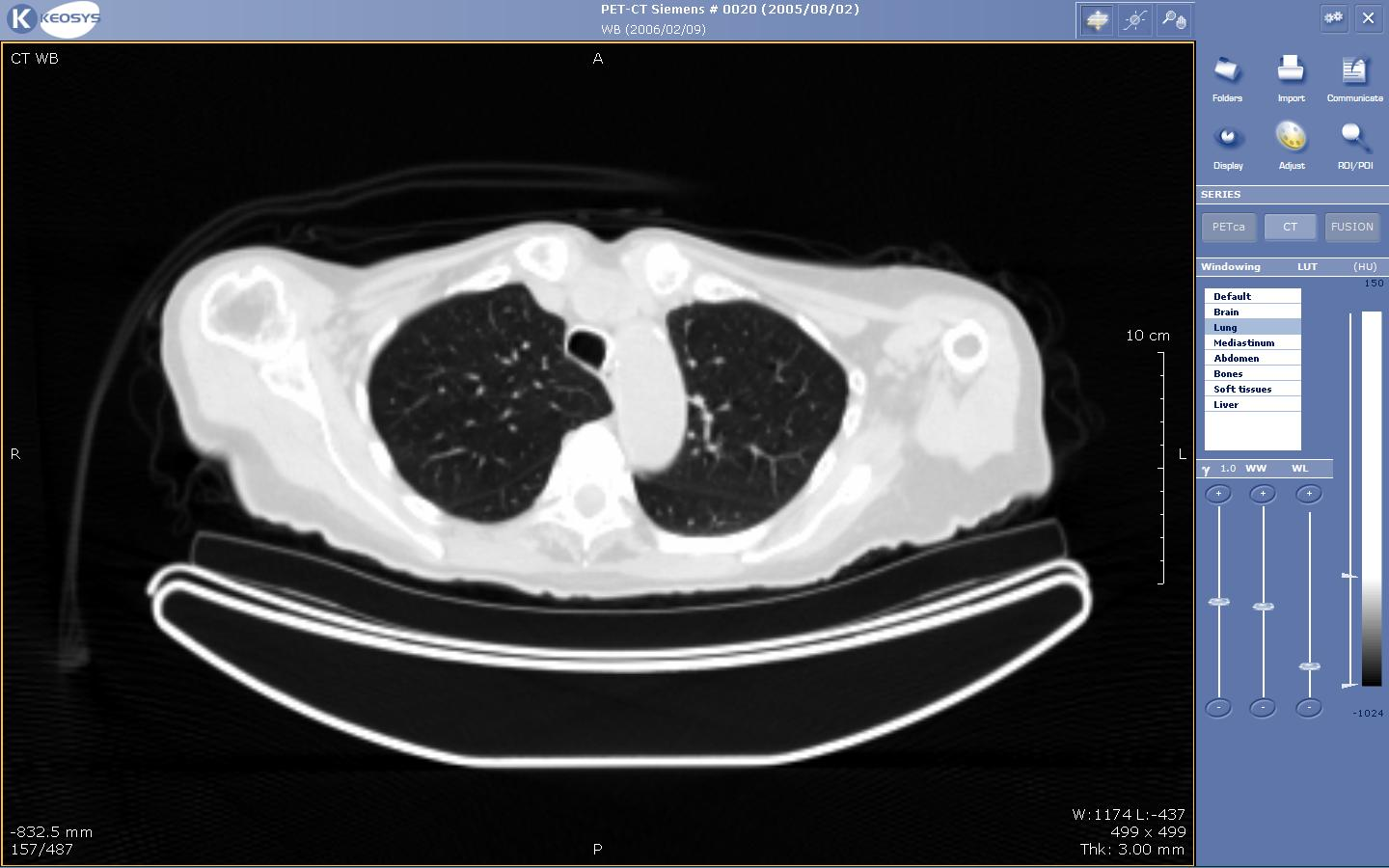
A CT scan of a patient's chest is displayed through teleradiology.

Teleradiology is the transmission of radiological patient images from procedures such as x-rays, Computed tomography (CT), and MRI imaging, from one location to another for the purposes of sharing studies with other radiologists and physicians. Teleradiology allows radiologists to provide services without actually having to be at the location of the patient. This is particularly important when a sub-specialist such as an MRI radiologist, neuroradiologist, pediatric radiologist, or musculoskeletal radiologist is needed, since these professionals are generally only located in large metropolitan areas working during daytime hours. Teleradiology allows for specialists to be available at all times.

Teleradiology utilizes standard network technologies such as the Internet, telephone lines, wide area networks, local area networks (LAN) and the latest advanced technologies such as medical cloud computing. Specialized software is used to transmit the images and enable the radiologist to effectively analyze potentially hundreds of images of a given study. Technologies such as advanced graphics processing, voice recognition, artificial intelligence, and image compression are often used in teleradiology. Through teleradiology and mobile DICOM viewers, images can be sent to another part of the hospital or to other locations around the world with equal effort.

Teleradiology is a growth technology given that imaging procedures are growing approximately 15% annually against an increase of only 2% in the radiologist population.

== Reports ==
Teleradiology services commonly provide either preliminary or final interpretations of medical imaging studies. Preliminary reads are frequently used in emergency settings to support immediate clinical decisions and may include direct communication of critical findings to the referring physician. Some providers report turnaround times of approximately 30 minutes for emergency cases, with faster processing for time-sensitive conditions such as stroke. Final reads are definitive and used in official patient records and billing. These reports typically include all relevant findings and may require access to prior imaging and clinical data. Teleradiology is also employed to provide off-hour or overflow coverage for healthcare institutions lacking continuous on-site radiology staffing.

== Subspecialties ==
Some teleradiologists are fellowship trained and have a wide variety of subspecialty expertise including such difficult-to-find areas as neuroradiology, pediatric neuroradiology, thoracic imaging, musculoskeletal radiology, mammography, and nuclear cardiology. There are also various medical practitioners who are not radiologists that take on studies in radiology to become sub specialists in their respected fields, an example of this is dentistry where oral and maxillofacial radiology allows those in dentistry to specialize in the acquisition and interpretation of radiographic imaging studies performed for diagnosis of treatment guidance for conditions affecting the maxillofacial region.

== Teleultrasound ==
Teleradiology infrastructure has also been adapted to support point-of-care ultrasound (POCUS) in remote and austere environments. In teleultrasound, a remote expert guides a non-specialist in real time during image acquisition. This technique has been successfully demonstrated in extreme settings, including aboard the International Space Station, on Mount Everest, and during helicopter flight.

== Regulations ==
In the United States, Medicare and Medicaid laws require the teleradiologist to be on U.S. soil in order to qualify for reimbursement of the Final Read.

In addition, advanced teleradiology systems must also be HIPAA compliant, which helps to ensure patients' privacy. HIPAA (Health Insurance Portability and Accountability Act of 1996) is a uniform, federal floor of privacy protections for consumers. It limits the ways that entities can use patients' personal information and protects the privacy of all medical information no matter what form it is in. Quality teleradiology must abide by important HIPAA rules to ensure patients' privacy is protected.

Also State laws governing the licensing requirements and medical malpractice insurance coverage required for physicians vary from state to state. Ensuring compliance with these laws is a significant overhead expense for larger multi-state teleradiology groups.

Medicare (Australia) has identical requirements to that of the United States, where the guidelines are provided by the Department of Health and Ageing, and government based payments fall under the Health Insurance Act 1973.

The regulations in Australia are also conducted at both federal and state levels, ensuring that strict guidelines are adhered to at all times, with regular yearly updates and amendments are introduced (usually around March and November of every year), ensuring that the legislation is kept up to date with changes in the industry.

One of the most recent changes to Medicare and radiology / teleradiology in Australia was the introduction of the Diagnostic Imaging Accreditation Scheme (DIAS) on 1 July 2008. DIAS was introduced to further improve the quality of Diagnostic Imaging and to amend the Health Insurance Act.

== Industry growth ==
Until the late 1990s teleradiology was primarily used by individual radiologists to interpret occasional emergency studies from offsite locations, often in the radiologists home. The connections were made through standard analog phone lines.

Teleradiology expanded rapidly as the growth of the internet and broad band combined with new CT scanner technology to become an essential tool in trauma cases in emergency rooms throughout the country. The occasional 2–3 x-ray studies a week soon became 3–10 CT scans, or more, a night. Because ER physicians are not trained to read CT scans or MRIs, radiologists went from working 8–10 hours a day, five and half days a week to a schedule of 24 hours a day, 7 days a week coverage. This became a particularly acute challenge in smaller rural facilities that only had one solo radiologist with no other to share call.

These circumstances spawned a post-dot.com boom of firms and groups that provided medical outsourcing, off-site teleradiology on-call services to hospitals and Radiology Groups around the country. As an example, a teleradiology firm might cover trauma at a hospital in Indiana with doctors based in Texas. Some firms even used overseas doctors in locations like Australia and India. Nighthawk, founded by Paul Berger, was the first to station U.S. licensed radiologists overseas (initially Australia and later Switzerland) to maximize the time zone difference to provide nightcall in U.S. hospitals.

Currently, teleradiology firms are facing pricing pressures. Industry consolidation is likely as there are more than 500 of these firms, large and small, throughout the United States.

== See also ==
- PACS
- Radiology
- RIS
- Telemedicine
- AI
