= Visible light imaging =

Medical imaging technique

Visible light imaging is an imaging modality that uses visible light.

== In Medicine ==
=== Standardization and Adoption ===
Even prior to specific support in DICOM for visible light imaging, the standard could already encapsulate color images, e.g., in JPEG format as Secondary Capture images . The need for standardized communication of digital visible light images from various specialties, and the need for specialty-specific acquisition context metadata and an appropriate controlled terminology was recognized not long after the DICOM standard was introduced and the terminology of visible light imaging was introduced to the standard . The United States Department of Veterans Affairs was an early adopter of a standardized approach to incorporating visible light images into the electronic medical record . Increasingly, visible light imaging is being deployed beyond individual departments, as part of a trend referred to as Enterprise Imaging .

=== Applicability ===
==== Endoscopy ====
Including fiberoptic endoscopy and rigid scope endoscopy:

- angioscopy
- arthroscopy
- bronchoscopy
- colposcopy
- cystoscopy
- fetoscopy
- hysteroscopy
- gastrointestinal endoscopy including esophagogastroduodenoscopy and colonoscopy
- laparoscopy
- nasopharyngoscopy
- sinoscopy

==== Microscopy ====
Including:

- Light microscopy for anatomic pathology, e.g., transmission light microscopy and reflection light microscopy for cytology and histology
- Surgical microscopy, e.g., images produced by an operating microscope used in:
  - cardiothoracic surgery
  - general surgery
  - neurologic surgery
  - obstetrics and gynecology
  - ophthalmic surgery
  - oral surgery and maxillofacial surgery
  - orthopedic surgery
  - otorhinolaryngology
  - pediatric surgery
  - plastic surgery
  - urology
  - vascular surgery

==== Photography ====
General anatomic photography, including:

- anatomic pathology
- dermatology
- dentistry
- forensic pathology
- ophthalmology, including retinal fundoscopy
- aesthetic (cosmetic) and reconstructive plastic surgery
- general medical photography

== See also ==
- DICOM
- Digital Photography
- Enterprise imaging
- Picture archiving and communication system
