= MEDHOST =

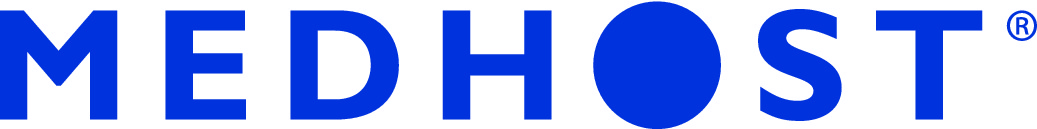
- Industry: Health Care Information Technology
- Founded: 1984
- Headquarters: Franklin, TN, U.S.
- Products: Health Informatics Software
- Website: www.medhost.com

MEDHOST is a Health Information Technology company, founded in 1984, which is based in Franklin, Tennessee, United States with a secondary office in Plano, Texas.

== Company history ==
On February 1 2010, HealthTech Holdings, the parent company of Healthcare Management Systems, Inc. (HMS), acquired MEDHOST Inc. MEDHOST's software was integrated into HMS' hospital information system.

In 2011, MEDHOST received ONC 2011 Edition certification for launching a Meaningful Use Stage 1 software package.

On December 16, 2013, HealthTech Holdings announced it had combined its subsidiaries and software, rebranding itself as MEDHOST and offering its products under the MEDHOST brand.

In 2014, MEDHOST was named one of Nashville Business Journal's top 25 fastest-growing private companies.

In 2017, MEDHOST became one of the first EHR vendors to achieve ONC 2015 Edition certification required by CMS MU Stage III.

In 2019, MEDHOST launched MEDHOST Business Services.

In 2020, MEDHOST launched Price Transparency product for hospitals.

In 2024, North Harris Computer Corporation acquired MEDHOST Inc.

== Leadership ==
Bill Anderson – Chairman and CEO

Ken Misch – President

Matthew Higgins – Chief Financial Officer

Kenneth Barfield – Executive Vice President, General Counsel
