= Life Image =

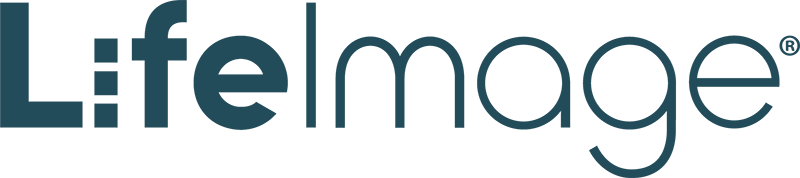
- Industry: Medical Image Sharing
- Founded: 2008
- Headquarters: Newton, Massachusetts, U.S.
- Key people: Matthew A. Michela (CEO)
- Number of employees: 100

Life Image is a medical evidence and image exchange network providing access to points of care and curated imaging data. Founded in 2008, Life Image's Interoperability Suite is a digital platform that uses vendor-agnostic integration standards to connect facilities, providers, clinics, and patients with life sciences, medical devices, and telehealth companies.

== Network Statistics ==
- 13,000 connection points in the U.S.
- 160,000 providers connected
- 58,000 global providers
- 12+ million clinical encounters per month
- 7 billion image files exchanged

== Company growth ==
Outside of its historical hospital network centered in academic medical centers, the company now has a number of other healthcare sectors on the Life Image network:

- Telehealth (in both teleradiology and care coordination)
- Health plans
- Physicians and small physician groups
- Imaging centers
- Life sciences
- Artificial intelligence
- Clinical research
- Direct to consumer and consumer sponsored application

== A Growing Partner Network ==
In November 2017, Life Image announced a partnership with Google Cloud Platform to develop novel solutions in artificial intelligence and machine learning.
