= Digital Mammographic Imaging Screening Trial =

The Digital Mammographic Imaging Screening Trial (DMIST) is a multi-institutional research study, beginning in 2001, on the efficacy for screening of full-field digital mammography (FFDM) compared to conventional film-screen mammography that was sponsored by the U.S. National Cancer Institute and performed by the American College of Radiology Imaging Network (ACRIN).

The findings that FFDM was not inferior to the existing technology, and potentially superior in younger women with dense breasts, has led to a rapid proliferation of digital systems in the US. On the other hand, women with dense breasts receive two to three times the amount of radiation during their imaging as dense breasts absorb more X-ray because of the density (difficulty of the X-ray to penetrate dense tissue).
