= Healthcare Information and Management Systems Society =

American healthcare association

- Abbreviation: HIMSS
- Formation: 1961
- Legal status: Nonprofit organization
- Headquarters: Chicago
- Members: 50,000+ individual members; 570+ corporate members; 225 not-for-profit associations members
- President & CEO: Harold F. Wolf III
- Website: himss.org

The Healthcare Information and Management Systems Society (HIMSS) is an American not-for-profit organization dedicated to improving health care in quality, safety, cost-effectiveness and access through the best use of information technology and management systems. It was founded in 1961 as the Hospital Management Systems Society. It is now headquartered in Chicago, Illinois. The society has more than 100,000 individuals, 480 provider organizations, 470 non-profit partners and 650 health services organizations (as of December 2019). HIMSS is a US 501(c)6 organization.

== History ==
HIMSS was organized in 1961 as the Hospital Management Systems Society (HMSS), an independent, unincorporated, nonprofit association of individuals. The society was co-founded by Edward J. Gerner and Harold E. Smalley. In late 1961, the constitution of the HIMSS was drafted and approved, and in 1962, the first national convention was held in Baltimore. In 1963, the second national HIMSS convention was held in Chicago, and the following year the HIMSS national headquarters were moved there. In 1967, the Bylaws, Rules and Regulations of HIMSS were written and approved. By 1982, HIMSS had 15 affiliated chapters (14 in the US and 1 in Australia). In 1986, the HIMSS was renamed to include "Information" in the title. By 1996, membership had grown to 7,500. Its annual conference in 2019 was attended by more than 42,000 in Orlando, Florida. As of February 2021, HIMSS achieved a membership milestone, surpassing more than 100,000 individual members. The year 2021 also marks the 60th anniversary of the organization.

=== Governance ===
Elected by the membership, the HIMSS Board of Directors serve a three-year term. "Hal" Wolf III was named president and CEO on July 26, 2017. He succeeded H. Stephen Lieber, who had served in those positions since 2000.

The Healthcare Information and Management Systems Society (HIMSS) was established in 1961 as the Hospital Management Systems Society (HMSS) by Edward J. Gerner and Harold E. Smalley. The first national convention was held in Baltimore in 1962, and the organization moved its headquarters to Chicago in 1964. HIMSS was renamed in 1986 to include "Information" in its title and had 7,500 members by 1996. The 2019 annual conference in Orlando saw over 42,000 attendees. By February 2021, HIMSS membership surpassed 100,000, coinciding with its 60th anniversary.

== Work ==
=== Electronic Medical Record Adoption Model ===
HIMSS' Electronic Medical Record Adoption Model is the most widely used assessment of digital excellence in healthcare internationally. The model goes from Stage 0 to Stage 7 and describes the adoption and use of electronic health records by hospitals. Stage 7 includes no use of paper charts and computerized provider order entry and clinical decision support systems are used in over 90% of the hospital. HIMSS Stage 7 remains an uncommon achievement. In 2018, 6% of hospitals in the US had achieved HIMSS Stage 7. There are various related frameworks.

=== Industry collaboration ===
Along with the Radiological Society of North America, HIMSS is a sponsor of the Integrating the Healthcare Enterprise (IHE) initiative. HIMSS is also home to the Electronic Health Records Association. Supported by both the American Medical Informatics Association and HIMSS, the Alliance for Nursing Informatics represents more than 2,000 nurses and brings together 18 distinct nursing informatics groups that function independently. With 76 partnering organizations, HIMSS sponsors National Health IT Week, a collaborative forum during which key healthcare constituents - vendors, provider organizations, payors, pharmaceutical/biotech companies, governmental agencies, industry/professional associations, research foundations, and consumer protection groups - work together to elevate national attention to the necessity of greater health IT (information technology) adoption.

On January 16, 2019, the company announced the sale of its HIMSS Analytics platform to Definitive Healthcare.

Electronic Medical Record Adoption Model: HIMSS developed the Electronic Medical Record Adoption Model (EMRAM), a globally recognized assessment of digital excellence in healthcare, ranging from Stage 0 to Stage 7. Stage 7, a rare achievement, indicates nearly complete elimination of paper records and extensive use of computerized provider order entry and clinical decision support systems. As of 2018, only 6% of US hospitals had reached Stage 7.

Industry Collaboration: HIMSS collaborates with the Radiological Society of North America on the Integrating the Healthcare Enterprise (IHE) initiative and supports the Electronic Health Records Association. The Alliance for Nursing Informatics, backed by HIMSS and the American Medical Informatics Association, represents over 2,000 nurses. HIMSS also sponsors National Health IT Week with 76 partner organizations to promote health IT adoption.

== Events ==
- March 3-6, 2025: HIMSS Global Health Conference and Exhibition, Las Vegas, Nevada.
- April 17–20, 2023: HIMSS Global Health Conference and Exhibition, Chicago, Illinois.
- March 14–18, 2022: HIMSS Global Health Conference and Exhibition, Orlando, Florida.
- August 8–13, 2021: HIMSS Global Health Conference and Exhibition, Las Vegas, Nevada.
- March 9–13, 2020: HIMSS Global Health Conference and Exhibition, Orlando, Florida. The conference had been canceled due to the coronavirus outbreak.
- February 11, 2019–February 15, 2019: Global Conference and Exhibition, Orlando, Florida
- March 5, 2018 – March 9, 2018: Annual HIMSS Conference 2018, Las Vegas, NV
- February 19, 2017–February 23, 2017: Annual HIMSS Conference 2017, Orlando, FL
- February 29–March 4, 2016: HIMSS Global Health Conference and Exhibition, Las Vegas, Nevada.
- April 12, 2015 – April 16, 2015: Annual HIMSS Conference, Chicago, Illinois
- September 15, 2014 – September 18, 2014: HIMSS AsiaPac, Marina Bay Sands, Singapore
- October 5, 2015 – October 9, 2015: National Health IT Week, United States
- June 4, 2014: HIMSS Virtual Conference
- Various dates – Regional Chapter Programs

== See also ==
- Health informatics
- Management system
- Electronic health record
- Digital health
- Analytics
