= Patient check-in =

Patient check-in is the process where patients begin their registration with the healthcare facility topically using a clipboard, electronic tablet, touch screen, kiosk, or by other method, sometimes self-service. Patient check-in start as far back as the Roman times when patients would wait for special services in purpose-built hospitals. As patient services were made more available, so was the need to have some method of tracking patients as they arrived.

== History ==
For many years, patient check-in and registration was done primarily through paper, clipboard, and pencil. Then, on August 21, 1996, President Clinton signed HIPAA into law, which included a Privacy Rule designed to protect patient's privacy. The privacy rule took effect on April 14, 2003, and changed the way hospitals, doctor's offices, outpatient ambulatory care centers, clinics, and surgery centers thought about collecting, sharing, and knowingly exposing Protected Health Information (PHI). In addition, the evolution of computers made it more affordable for institutions to transition to an electronic check-in system, replacing traditional paper sign-in sheets. In later years, tablets and touch screen devices continued to increase in functionality while becoming more readily available and affordable.

== Technology today ==
Healthcare facilities are realizing that HIPAA compliance and efficiency are no longer optional if they want to provide quality healthcare and avoid hefty fees and penalties. Patient Check-in is one of these areas of improvement for healthcare organizations motivated by HIPAA, Meaningful Use, and Lean/Six Sigma projects. Healthcare is finally starting to adopt technologies that other industries have implemented and relied on for many years now. Just as airlines, hotels, movie theaters, movie rentals, and grocery stores have discovered, self-service options provide higher throughput, reduce errors, and improve customer satisfaction. Bottom line, they make the organization more efficient and thus more profitable. Hospitals and clinics are realizing they can simply replace their paper sign-in sheets with a tablet or a wall-mounted or floor stand kiosk to realize a huge efficiency gain.

== Concerns ==
Loss of personal touch – by implementing a self-service check-in process, one misconception is the risk of losing personal touch with the patient. The truth is the check-in system separates people signing in from the HIPAA protected conversations between the office staff and patients at the window. Also, the patient gets to sign in faster due to the system being closer to the door. Although defeating the purposes of the check-in, some organizations mitigate this by providing concierge greeters to welcome and assist patients. Obviously this is additional cost to the office. Others make it completely optional, so those patients that like an experience with a live person or who feel intimidated by technology, still can have the option to use the traditional face-to-face or paper process. By using a welcoming concierge or by making electronic check-in optional, the organization can still benefit from an improved workflow, cater to those who cannot use technology, while keeping a personal touch and a high level of patient service.

Theft – tablets and pagers that walk off are a big concern to many organizations investing in hardware. The best way to mitigate that is through properly mounting hardware by using table-top mounted, wall-mounted, or floor-mounted kiosks with security fasteners (star screws and key locks). If a non-mounted table-top tablet or kiosk is used, theft can be eliminated by putting the devices in close proximity to staff – ideally on the same countertop where the paper sign-in sheet was previously located. If tablets, pagers, or devices are given out to patients to read and collect a variety of data, a good practice may be to collect minimal data such as name, date of birth, and picture to provide accountability, then assign the asset to the person so it can be tracked. Another added benefit to many newer tablets is the ability to go into lockdown mode, even going as far as capturing GPS info, then reporting that when a connection is available. These systems provide an affordable way to protect your investment if theft is still a concern.

Patient Acceptance – many organizations feel that elderly or those uncomfortable with technology may will have a difficult time using electronic patient check-in. However, a properly-sized screen paired with wizard style check-in requiring minimal typing can highly improve the patient acceptance rate. In addition, offering prompts and questions in multiple languages can further improve user acceptance. Another method that may improve patient acceptance is pairing kiosks with welcoming or concierge staff who can assist patients through the process, explain the process, help them check-in, offer them a beverage, and show them to their seat. This service can often be offered by volunteer staff.

Complexity - The first thought is to have a kiosk that will make patients verify their personal information, update their medical history, check their insurance, take their co-pay, print a receipt. sign a waiver and then ask what symptoms they are having. All before they get to see anyone in the office. While these are great ideas consider the downsides of a complicated kiosk. Integration with other systems means cost and tech staff. How long will it take for a patient who has never seen the system? Since it takes longer, how many kiosks will you need? Does every patient have to go through the same process? What happens when the patient doesn't care about accuracy?

On the other side, some patient check in systems are simple, fast and more cost effective. Instead of trying to replace the office staff, simple systems complement the existing EMR and give the staff a tool for organizing the patients. Simple systems generally only collect the name, reason for visit and a timestamp. The advantage they provide is organization and privacy.

== Operations and uses ==
Simple systems are usually lower cost and easier for the patient. Many of these systems are tablet based and use inexpensive hardware such as the Apple iPad or an Android tablet. Medical Check In is one of the least expensive on the market and uses the iPad. It asks for the patient name and reason for visit, then passes the information to the computers in the office. The system is not integrated and is not designed as a data acquisition type.

In additional to the on-site kiosk, the patient documentation can be completed remotely before the patient visit reducing the patient wait time, one of the major advantage of using paperless system at the front office. With introduction of cloud technology in recent years, healthcare offices are now able to easily manage the patient documentation without need to spend hours in manually scanning the forms and duplicate entries in the system.

Beyond simply asking for a patient's name like paper sign-in sheets traditionally did, the self-service kiosks can gather much more info to facilitate registration. Savance Health's solution offers integration with license, ID, credit card, and insurance card scanning devices, allowing the patient to identify themselves quickly and accurately with little to no keyboard input. By using a duplex ID/insurance card scanner with a magnetic strip reader, healthcare organizations can acquire a digitally scanned image of the front and back of the patient's license and insurance card to automatically keep it on file (in PDF format for example). In addition, a magnetic card swipe (MSR) credit card reader can be connected so co-pays or open balances can be collected and processed before services are offered. Eligibility checking can also be offered automatically through services like eligibilityapi.com for small transactional fees. Another common function during check-in is for patient's to verify their insurance and address info that is on file. Changes can be made and verified by the patient rather than staff eliminating common mistakes from typos that ultimately lead to inaccurate data.

In addition to verifying data, focusing on patient safety and infection control can also be managed by asking simple questions like, “Are you a fall risk?” and “Do you have or have you recently had a cough, temperature, or flu-like symptoms?”. Based on their answers, staff can properly handle the patient or the kiosk can instruct the patient to wear a mask. Another common question is, “Do you require an interpreter?” allowing the appropriate staff from interpreter services or similar to automatically be dispatched.

Virtually any question or data that organizations may collect now can be collected in a self-service check-in kiosk. By coupling this with pagers, text alerting, and waiting room displays, patient satisfaction and Hcap scores can have a big impact.

== Related services ==
Patient Tracking – the movement of the patient through an ER, surgery center, outpatient facility, ambulatory care facility, or throughout the entire hospital is often plagued with bottlenecks, inefficiencies, and poor handoff. The patient is often the one that suffers. When an electronic patient check-in process is implemented, patient tracking can start immediately when the patient enters the building. From there, the right staff can properly be contacted. As the patient progresses along their care path, say in a surgery center, patients can be assured the most prompt service when staff communicate effectively. In addition, patient tracking provides constant measuring using electronic time stamps allowing automatic, accurate, and constant feedback on performance.

Waiting Room Optimization – since patient check-in typically starts the process for a customer, optimizing the waiting room experience significantly can improve customer satisfaction scores. For example, using pagers similar to those used in the restaurant business can allow patients to freely roam the hospital and stay in constant communications with the front desk.

Time Use Study Data – this kind of data is traditionally gathered manually through spot checks. Staff typically have to document times for every step of the process for a given set of patients or all patients on a given day. Then this data is manually tabulated in order to identify bottlenecks. Improvements can then be identified and an action plan can be created. After implementing the action plan, staff then repeat the process over again to measure and gauge improvement.

Co-Pay and Open Balance Collections – the movement to private insurance and the increase in co-pays has many patients carrying a balance. In addition, co-pays account for a higher percentage of the overall compensation than they once did making co-pay collection a more important part of the healthcare process.

Electronic Forms and Signature Capture – patient intake forms, new patient forms, consent forms, health history forms, HIPAA portability forms, and other data-driven or signature captured forms are prevalent in today's healthcare organizations. Unfortunately, the majority of them are paper-based as of the time this article was written. Patient check-in can give healthcare organizations a chance to feed electronic data into their operations with or without a newer EMR.

Eligibility Verification – to ensure that a healthcare organization gets paid for its provided services, it is common for staff to do eligibility verification via telephone or through an interactive website. This can provide the most up-to-date verification to ensure the healthcare organization will get paid by the carrier such as Medicaid, Medicare, or the insurance provider for the services scheduled for the day.

Integration with EMR – reading demographic, appointment, order and billing data from the EMR can help improve overall workflow around patient check-in systems by reducing time spent charting any data entered into the patient check-in system. HL7 is the primary method used to integrate with EMR systems.

Communications – several communication enhancements can be realized through an electronic patient check-in system. For example, in a dentistry, if a patient shows up for their cleaning and the hygienist is waiting for them, immediately upon arrival the hygienist can be alerted via e-mail, text, as well as a popup on the PC. This provides the fastest service possible while allowing other staff members to optimize their time while waiting for patients to arrive. In this example, that includes an office manager as well as the hygienist. The same goes for a larger organization such as a hospital. When the patient walks into the main entrance of the hospital, a greeter can assist them during the check-in process, at that point, the system can automatically know the services they are here for or the kiosk/staff can gather that info. The system can then alert the department that their patient is on their way up so they are fully prepared when the patient arrives. Similarly, if the patient needs to flow from medical imaging to labs, electronic communications, tracking, and alerting can help hand off a patient further allowing staff to prepare for the arriving patient.
