= Hospital information system =

Sociotechnical infrastructure for centralized and digital health care management

A hospital information system (HIS) is an element of health informatics that primarily addresses the administrative and operational needs of hospitals. In many implementations, an HIS is a comprehensive, integrated information system designed to manage all aspects of a hospital's operation, including medical, administrative, financial, and legal processes. HIS is also referred to as hospital management software or hospital management system (HMS). More broadly, an HIS is a type of medical information system (MIS).

Hospital information systems provide a centralized source of patient data, including medical histories, lab results, imaging, and visit schedules. Modern HIS solutions, such as Medicare HMS , ensure that data is secure, accessible only to authorized personnel, and available at the point of care. They enhance coordination among healthcare professionals by making patient information available when and where it is needed. Portable devices like smartphones and tablet computers are often used at the bedside for real-time access. These systems also support data integration across departments, improving coordination and decision-making in healthcare facilities.

HIS solutions typically consist of multiple software components with specialty-specific modules, and can integrate sub-systems such as laboratory information system (LIS), radiology information system (RIS), picture archiving and communication system (PACS), or policy and procedure management tools.

== Potential benefits ==
Operational efficiency: Streamlines hospital administration, finances, diet management, and medical supply distribution. Provides insights into hospital performance and growth.

Improved medication management: Tracks drug usage, reduces adverse interactions, and ensures optimal pharmaceutical utilization.

Enhanced data integrity: Minimizes transcription errors, avoids duplicate entries, and ensures reliable patient records.

Modern HIS platforms, like Medicare HMS , combine administrative, clinical, and operational modules in a single system, helping hospitals improve patient care while simplifying staff workflows.

== See also ==
- Clinical documentation improvement
- Cloud computing
- Computer security § Medical systems
- DICOM
- Electronic health record (EHR)
- European Institute for Health Records (EuroRec)
- Health information management
- Health information technology
- Import and export of data (medical data export and sharing between hospitals)
- List of open source healthcare software
- Medical imaging
- Medical record
- Personal health record
- Patient tracking system
- Solid health
