= Integrating the Healthcare Enterprise =

Non-profit organization

- Abbreviation: IHE
- Formation: 1998
- Legal status: Non-profit
- Headquarters: Oak Brook, Illinois
- Website: www.ihe.net

Integrating the Healthcare Enterprise (IHE) is a non-profit organization based in the US state of Illinois. It sponsors an initiative by the healthcare industry to improve the way computer systems share information. IHE was established in 1998 by a consortium of radiologists and information technology (IT) experts.

== Operations ==
IHE created and operates a process through which interoperability of health care IT systems can be improved. The group gathers case requirements, identifies available standards, and develops technical guidelines which manufacturers can implement. IHE also stages "connectathons" and "interoperability showcases" in which vendors assemble to demonstrate the interoperability of their products.

== Sponsorship ==
IHE is sponsored by the Healthcare Information and Management Systems Society (HIMSS), the Radiological Society of North America (RSNA), and the American College of Cardiology (ACC). The eye care domain is sponsored by the American Academy of Ophthalmology. The radiation oncology domain is sponsored by the American Association of Physicists in Medicine.

== Projects ==
IHE integration profiles describe a clinical information need or workflow scenario and document how to use established standards to accomplish it. A group of systems that implement the same integration profile address the need/scenario in a mutually compatible way.

For example, the Digital Imaging and Communications in Medicine (DICOM) standards specify many different formats for image data. A given set of images that might comply with some optional parts of the standards might still not be accepted by an application in use by a particular radiologist. Profiles reduce the chances of these incompatibilities.

The Logical Observation Identifiers Names and Codes (LOINC) standard codes for use in databases are often used in IHE profiles.

A model for cross-enterprise document sharing called XDS allows hospitals to share electronic records that use the Health Level 7 (HL7) standards and LOINC codes. The United States Department of Veterans Affairs revised its plans in 1999 to adopt IHE recommendations.

IHE integration statements are prepared and published by a vendor to list the IHE profiles supported by a specific release of a specific product.

IHE technical frameworks are detailed documents which specify the integration profiles and associated actors (systems) and transactions.

IHE connectathons are annual events, where equipment vendors bring products with IHE profiles and test them with other vendors. The events are held in Europe, USA, Korea, Japan and Australia. The term "connectathon" was coined in the 1980s by Sun Microsystems for similar vendor-neutral interoperability testing of the Network File System protocols and related technologies. The first NFS Connectathon was held in 1985.

In 2008, an agreement was announced for cooperation with the Continua Health Alliance.

In 2012, a guide was published on access to health data from mobile devices.

Although in 2004 an estimate was that complete interoperability could be completed in ten years, by 2013 results were still mixed.

In 2013, co-chairs were David Mendelson, director of clinical informatics at Mount Sinai Medical Center and Elliot B. Sloane of the Center for Healthcare Information Research and Policy and research professor at Drexel University.
