= Radiological information system =

Software for radiologists

A radiological information system (RIS) is the core system for the electronic management of medical imaging departments. The major functions of the RIS can include patient scheduling, resource management, examination performance tracking, reporting, results distribution, and procedure billing. RIS complements HIS (hospital information systems) and PACS (picture archiving and communication system), and is critical to efficient workflow to radiology practices.

== Basic features ==
Radiological information systems commonly support the following features:

- Patient registration and scheduling
- Patient list management
- Modality interface using worklists
- Workflow management within a radiology department
- Request and document scanning
- Result entry
- Digital reporting (usually using Voice Recognition (VR))
- Printables such as patient letters and printed reports
- Result transmission via HL7 integration or e-mailing of clinical reports
- Patient tracking
- Interactive documents
- Creation of technical files
- Modality and material management
- Consent management

== Additional features ==
In addition, a RIS often supports the following:

- Appointment scheduling
- Voice Recognition (VR)
- PACS workflow
- Custom report creation
- HL7 interfaces with a PACS. HL7 also enables communication between HIS and RIS in addition to RIS and PACS.
- Critical findings notification
- Billing
- Rule engines
- Cross-site workflow

== See also ==
- DICOM
- Electronic health record (EHR)
- Health Level 7
- Medical imaging
- Medical software
