= Picture archiving and communication system =

Medical imaging technology

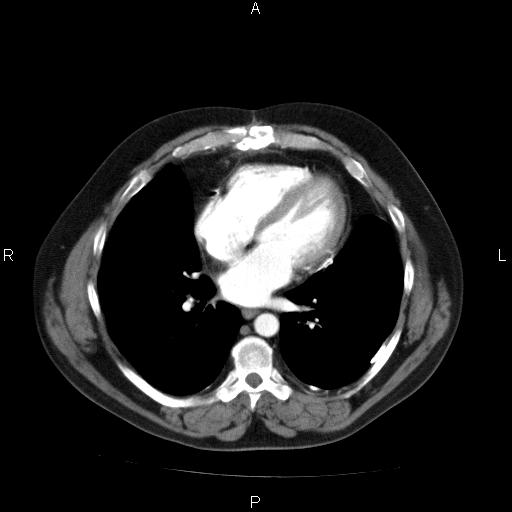
An image as stored on a picture archiving and communication system (PACS)

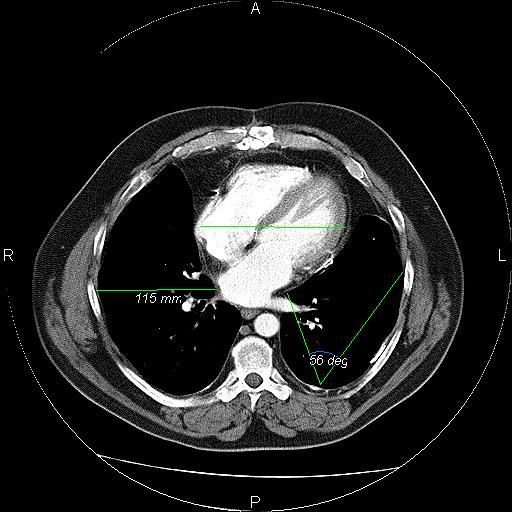
The same image following contrast adjustment, sharpening and measurement tags added by the system

A picture archiving and communication system (PACS) is a medical imaging technology which provides economical storage and convenient access to images from multiple modalities (source machine types). Electronic images and reports are transmitted digitally via PACS; this eliminates the need to manually file, retrieve, or transport film jackets, the folders used to store and protect X-ray film. The universal format for PACS image storage and transfer is DICOM (Digital Imaging and Communications in Medicine). Non-image data, such as scanned documents, may be incorporated using consumer industry standard formats like PDF (Portable Document Format), once encapsulated in DICOM. A PACS consists of four major components: The imaging modalities such as X-ray plain film (PF), computed tomography (CT) and magnetic resonance imaging (MRI), a secured network for the transmission of patient information, workstations for interpreting and reviewing images, and archives for the storage and retrieval of images and reports. Combined with available and emerging web technology, PACS has the ability to deliver timely and efficient access to images, interpretations, and related data. PACS reduces the physical and time barriers associated with traditional film-based image retrieval, distribution, and display.

== Types of images ==
Most PACS handle images from various medical imaging instruments, including ultrasound (US), magnetic resonance (MR), Nuclear Medicine imaging, positron emission tomography (PET), computed tomography (CT), endoscopy (ES), mammograms (MG), digital radiography (DR), phosphor plate radiography, Visible Light Photography (VL), Histopathology, ophthalmology, etc. Additional types of image formats are always being added. Clinical areas beyond radiology; cardiology, oncology, gastroenterology, and even the laboratory are creating medical images that can be incorporated into PACS. (see DICOM Application areas).

== Uses ==
PACS has four main uses:

- Hard copy replacement: PACS replaces hard-copy based means of managing medical images, such as film archives. With the decreasing price of digital storage, PACS provide a growing cost and space advantage over film archives in addition to the instant access to prior images at the same institution. Digital copies are referred to as Soft-copy.
- Remote access: It expands on the possibilities of conventional systems by providing capabilities of off-site viewing and reporting (distance education, telediagnosis). It enables practitioners in different physical locations to access the same information simultaneously for teleradiology.
- Electronic image integration platform: PACS provides the electronic platform for radiology images interfacing with other medical automation systems such as Hospital Information System (HIS), Electronic Medical Record (EMR), Practice Management Software, and Radiology Information System (RIS).
- Radiology Workflow Management: PACS is used by radiology personnel to manage the workflow of patient exams.

PACS is offered by virtually all the major medical imaging equipment manufacturers, medical IT companies and many independent software companies. Basic PACS software can be found free on the Internet.

== Architecture ==
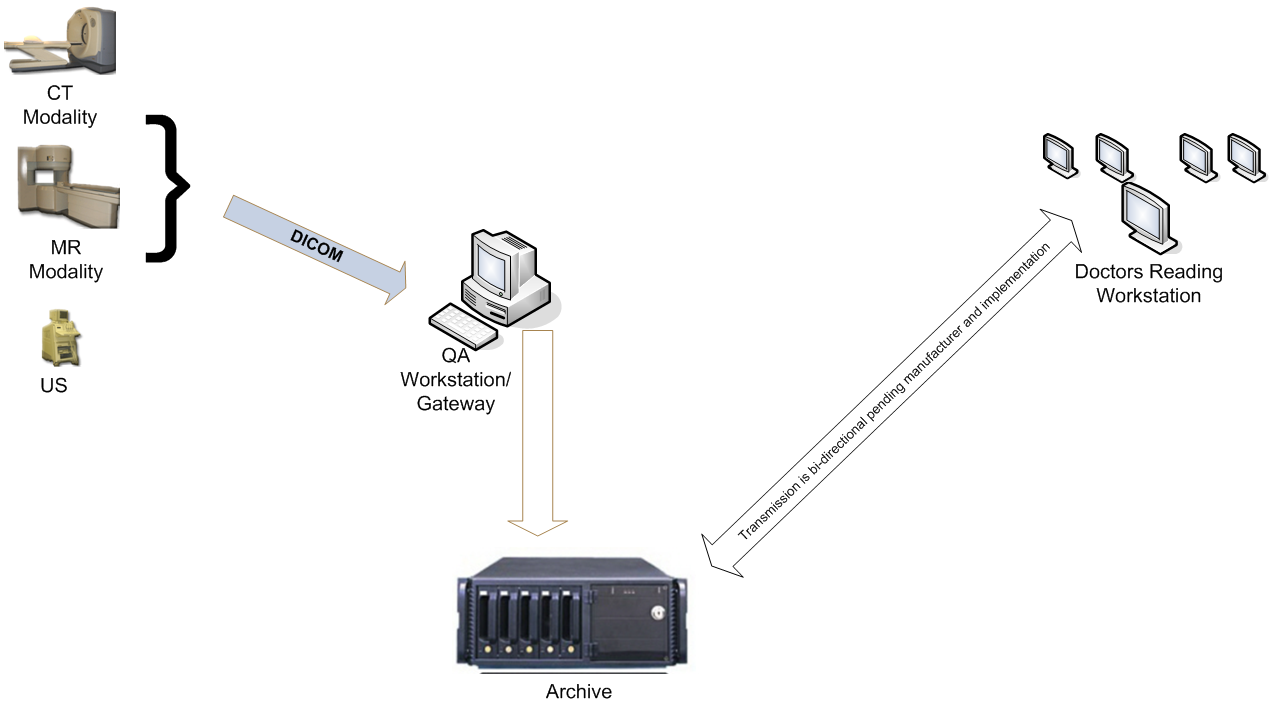
PACS workflow diagram

The architecture is the physical implementation of required functionality, or what one sees from the outside. There are different views, depending on the user. A radiologist typically sees a viewing station, a technologist a QA workstation, while a PACS administrator might spend most of their time in the climate-controlled computer room. The composite view is rather different for the various vendors.

Typically a PACS consists of a multitude of devices. The first step in typical PACS systems is the modality. Modalities are typically computed tomography (CT), ultrasound, nuclear medicine, positron emission tomography (PET), and magnetic resonance imaging (MRI). Depending on the facility's workflow most modalities send to a quality assurance (QA) workstation, sometimes called a PACS gateway. The QA workstation is a checkpoint to make sure patient demographics are correct as well as other important attributes of a study. If the study information is correct the images are passed to the archive for storage. The central storage device (archive) stores images and in some cases reports, measurements and other information that resides with the images. The next step in the PACS workflow is the reading workstations. The reading workstation is where the radiologist reviews the patient's study and formulates their diagnosis. Normally tied to the reading workstation is a reporting package that assists the radiologist with dictating the final report. Reporting software is optional and there are various ways in which doctors prefer to dictate their report. Ancillary to the workflow mentioned, there is normally CD/DVD authoring software used to burn patient studies for distribution to patients or referring physicians. The diagram above shows a typical workflow in most imaging centers and hospitals. Note that this section does not cover integration to a Radiology Information System, Hospital Information System and other such front-end system that relates to the PACS workflow.

More PACS include web-based interfaces to utilize the internet or a wide area network (WAN) as their means of communication, usually via VPN (Virtual Private Network) or SSL (Secure Sockets Layer). The clients side software may use ActiveX, JavaScript and/or a Java Applet. More PACS clients are full applications which can utilize the full resources of the computer they are executing on and are unaffected by the frequent unattended Web Browser and Java updates. As the need for distribution of images and reports becomes more widespread there is a push for PACS systems to support DICOM part 18 of the DICOM standard. Web Access to DICOM Objects (WADO) creates the necessary standard to expose images and reports over the web through truly portable medium. Without stepping outside the focus of the PACS architecture, WADO becomes the solution to cross platform capability and can increase the distribution of images and reports to referring physicians and patients.

PACS image backup is a critical, but sometimes overlooked, part of the PACS Architecture (see below). Within the United States, HIPAA requires that backup copies of patient images be made in case of image loss from the PACS. There are several methods of backing up the images, but they typically involve automatically sending copies of the images to a separate computer for storage, preferably off-site.

== Querying (C-FIND) and Image (Instance) Retrieval (C-MOVE and C-GET) ==
The communication with the PACS server is done through DICOM messages that are similar to DICOM image "headers", but with different attributes. A query (C-FIND) is performed as follows:

- The client establishes the network connection to the PACS server.
- The client prepares a C-FIND request message which is a list of DICOM attributes.
- The client fills in the C-FIND request message with the keys that should be matched. E.g. to query for a patient ID, the patient ID attribute is filled with the patient's ID.
- The client creates empty (zero length) attributes for all the attributes it wishes to receive from the server. E.g. if the client wishes to receive an ID that it can use to receive images (see image retrieval) it should include a zero-length SOPInstanceUID (0008,0018) attribute in the C-FIND request messages.
- The C-FIND request message is sent to the server.
- The server sends back to the client a list of C-FIND response messages, each of which is also a list of DICOM attributes, populated with values for each match.
- The client extracts the attributes that are of interest from the response messages objects.

Images (and other composite instances like Presentation States and Structured Reports) are then retrieved from a PACS server through either a C-MOVE or C-GET request, using the DICOM network protocol. Retrieval can be performed at the Study, Series or Image (instance) level. The C-MOVE request specifies where the retrieved instances should be sent (using separate C-STORE messages on one or more separate connections) with an identifier known as the destination Application Entity Title (AE Title). For a C-MOVE to work, the server must be configured with mapping of the AE Title to a TCP/IP address and port, and as a consequence the server must know in advance all the AE Titles that it will ever be requested to send images to. A C-GET, on the other hand, performs the C-STORE operations on the same connection as the request, and hence does not require that the "server" know the "client" TCP/IP address and port. This allows C-GET to work more easily through firewalls and with network address translation, environments in which the incoming TCP C-STORE connections required for C-MOVE may not get through. The difference between C-MOVE and C-GET is somewhat analogous to the difference between active and passive FTP. C-MOVE is most commonly used within enterprises and facilities, whereas C-GET is more practical between enterprises.

In addition to the traditional DICOM network services, particularly for cross-enterprise use, DICOM (and IHE) define other retrieval mechanisms, including WADO, WADO-WS and most recently WADO-RS.

== Image archival and backup ==
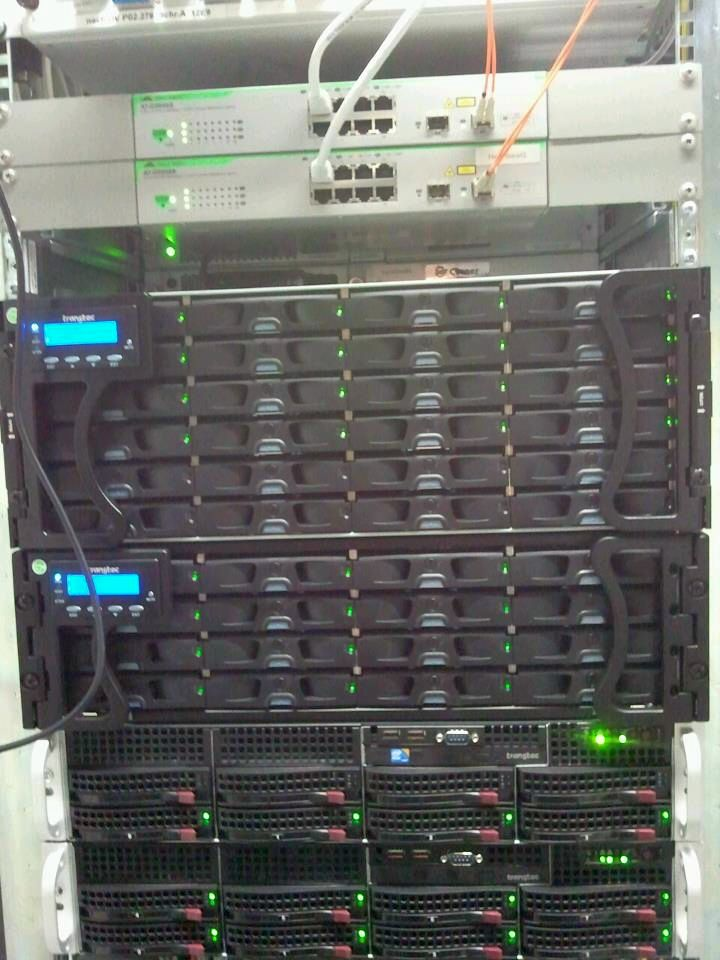
PACS-Server with 35-terabyte RAID Archive and high-speed fiber optic switch

Digital medical images are typically stored locally on a PACS for retrieval. It is important (and required in the United States by the Security Rule's Administrative Safeguards section of HIPAA) that facilities have a means of recovering images in the event of an error or disaster. While each facility is different, the goal in image back-up is to make it automatic and as easy to administer as possible. The hope is that the copies won't be needed; however, disaster recovery and business continuity planning dictates that plans should include maintaining copies of data even when an entire site is temporarily or permanently lost.

Ideally, copies of images should be maintained in several locations, including off-site to provide disaster recovery capabilities. In general, PACS data are no different than other business critical data and should be protected with multiple copies at multiple locations. As PACS data can be considered protected health information (PHI), regulations may apply, most notably HIPAA and HIPAA Hi-Tech requirements.

Images may be stored both locally and remotely on off-line media such as disk, tape or optical media. The use of storage systems, using modern data protection technologies has become increasingly common, particularly for larger organizations with greater capacity and performance requirements. Storage systems may be configured and attached to the PACS server in various ways, either as Direct-Attached Storage (DAS), Network-attached storage (NAS), or via a Storage Area Network (SAN). However the storage is attached, enterprise storage systems commonly utilize RAID and other technologies to provide high availability and fault tolerance to protect against failures. In the event that it is necessary to reconstruct a PACS partially or completely, some means of rapidly transferring data back to the PACS is required, preferably while the PACS continues to operate.

Modern data storage replication technologies may be applied to PACS information, including the creation of local copies via point-in-time copy for locally protected copies, along with complete copies of data on separate repositories including disk and tape based systems. Remote copies of data should be created, either by physically moving tapes off-site, or copying data to remote storage systems. Whenever HIPAA protected data are moved, it should be encrypted, which includes sending via physical tape or replication technologies over WAN to a secondary location.

Other options for creating copies of PACS data include removable media (hard drives, DVDs or other media that can hold many patients' images) that is physically transferred off-site. HIPAA HITECH mandates encryption of stored data in many instances or other security mechanisms to avoid penalties for failure to comply.

The back-up infrastructure may also be capable of supporting the migration of images to a new PACS. Due to the high volume of images that need to be archived many rad centers are migrating their systems to a Cloud-based PACS.

== Integration ==
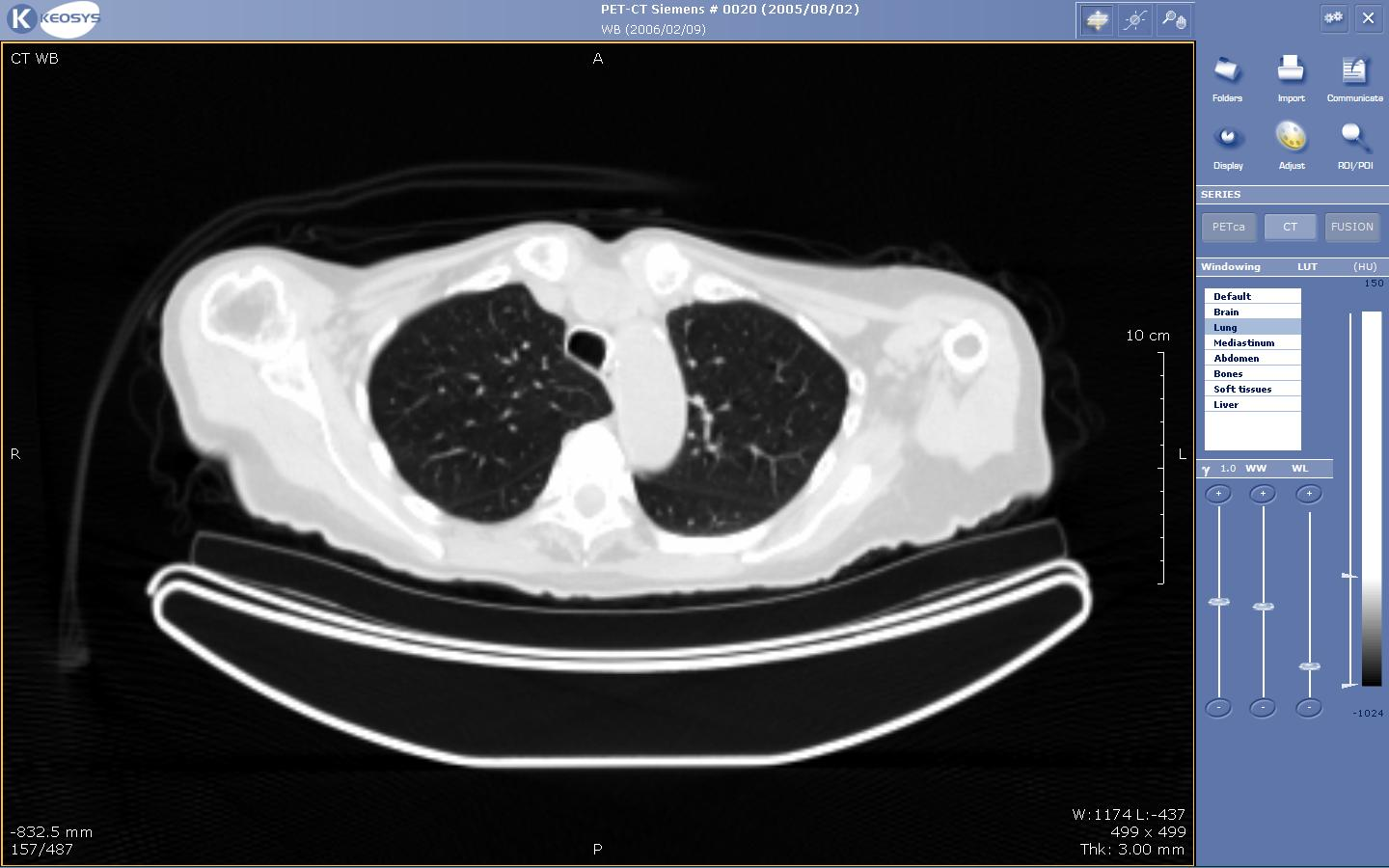
A chest image displayed via a PACS

A full PACS should provide a single point of access for images and their associated data. That is, it should support all digital modalities, in all departments, throughout the organisation.

However, until PACS penetration is complete, individual islands of digital imaging not yet connected to a central PACS may exist. These may take the form of a localized, modality-specific network of modalities, workstations and storage (a so-called "mini-PACS"), or may consist of a small cluster of modalities directly connected to reading workstations without long-term storage or management. Such systems are also often not connected to the departmental information system. Historically, Ultrasound, Nuclear Medicine and Cardiology Cath Labs are often departments that adopt such an approach.

More recently, Full Field digital mammography (FFDM) has taken a similar approach, largely because of the large image size, highly specialized reading workflow and display requirements, and intervention by regulators. The rapid deployment of FFDM in the US following the DMIST study has led to the integration of Digital Mammography and PACS becoming more commonplace.

All PACS, whether they span the entire enterprise or are localized within a department, should also interface with existing hospital information systems: Hospital information system (HIS) and Radiology Information System (RIS). There are several kinds of data flowing into PACS as inputs for next procedures and back to HIS as results corresponding inputs:

In: Patient Identification and Orders for examination. These data are sent from HIS to RIS via integration interface, in most hospitals, via the HL7 protocol. Patient ID and Orders will be sent to Modality (CT, MR, etc.) via the DICOM protocol (Worklist). Images will be created after images scanning and then forwarded to PACS Server. Diagnosis Report is created based on the images retrieved for presenting from PACS Server by physician/radiologist and then saved to RIS System.
Out: Diagnosis Report and Images created accordingly. Diagnosis Report is sent back to HIS via HL7 usually and Images are sent back to HIS via DICOM usually if there is a DICOM Viewer integrated with HIS in hospitals (In most of cases, Clinical Physician gets reminder of Diagnosis Report coming and then queries images from PACS Server).

Interfacing between multiple systems provides a more consistent and more reliable dataset:

- Less risk of entering an incorrect patient ID for a study – modalities that support DICOM worklists can retrieve identifying patient information (patient name, patient number, accession number) for upcoming cases and present that to the technologist, preventing data entry errors during acquisition. Once the acquisition is complete, the PACS can compare the embedded image data with a list of scheduled studies from RIS, and can flag a warning if the image data do not match a scheduled study.
- Data saved in the PACS can be tagged with unique patient identifiers (such as a social security number or NHS number) obtained from HIS. Providing a robust method of merging datasets from multiple hospitals, even where the different centers use different ID systems internally.

An interface can also improve workflow patterns:

- When a study has been reported by a radiologist the PACS can mark it as read. This avoids needless double-reading. The report can be attached to the images and be viewable via a single interface.
- Improved use of online storage and nearline storage in the image archive. The PACS can obtain lists of appointments and admissions in advance, allowing images to be pre-fetched from off-line storage or near-line storage onto online disk storage.

Recognition of the importance of integration has led a number of suppliers to develop fully integrated RIS/PACS. These may offer a number of advanced features:

- Dictation of reports can be integrated into a single system. Integrated speech-to-text voice recognition software may be used to create and upload a report to the patient's chart within minutes of the patient's scan, or the reporting physician may dictate their findings into a phone system or voice recorder. That recording may be automatically sent to a transcript writer's workstation for typing, but it can also be made available for access by physicians, avoiding typing delays for urgent results, or retained in case of typing error.
- Provides a single tool for quality control and audit purposes. Rejected images can be tagged, allowing later analysis (as may be required under radiation protection legislation). Workloads and turn-around time can be reported automatically for management purposes.

== Acceptance testing ==
The PACS installation process is complicated requiring time, resources, planning, and testing. Installation is not complete until the acceptance test is passed. Acceptance testing of a new installation is a vital step to assure user compliance, functionality, and especially clinical safety. Take for example the Therac-25, a radiation medical device involved in accidents in which patients were given massive overdoses of radiation, due to unverified software control.

The acceptance test determines whether the PACS is ready for clinical use and marks the warranty timeline while serving as a payment milestone. The test process varies in time requirements depending on facility size but contract condition of 30-day time limit is not unusual. It requires detailed planning and development of testing criteria prior to writing the contract. It is a joint process requiring defined test protocols and benchmarks.

Testing uncovers deficiencies. A study determined that the most frequently cited deficiencies were the most costly components. Failures ranked from most-to-least common are: Workstation; HIS/RIS/ACS broker interfaces; RIS; Computer Monitors; Web-based image distribution system; Modality interfaces; Archive devices; Maintenance; Training; Network; DICOM; Teleradiology; Security; Film digitizer.

== History ==
One of the first basic PACS was created in 1972 by Dr Richard J. Steckel.

The principles of PACS were first discussed at meetings of radiologists in 1982. Various people are credited with the coinage of the term PACS. Cardiovascular radiologist Dr Andre Duerinckx reported in 1983 that he had first used the term in 1981. Dr Samuel Dwyer, though, credits Dr Judith M. Prewitt for introducing the term.

Dr Harold Glass, a medical physicist working in London in the early 1990s secured UK Government funding and managed the project over many years which transformed Hammersmith Hospital in London as the first filmless hospital in the United Kingdom. Dr Glass died a few months after the project came live but is credited with being one of the pioneers of PACS.

The first large-scale PACS installation was in 1982 at the University of Kansas, Kansas City.

== Regulatory concerns ==
In the US PACS are classified as Medical Devices, and hence if for sale are regulated by the USFDA. In general they are subject to Class 2 controls and hence require a 510(k), though individual PACS components may be subject to less stringent general controls. Some specific applications, such as the use for primary mammography interpretation, are additionally regulated within the scope of the Mammography Quality Standards Act.

The Society for Imaging Informatics in Medicine (SIIM) is the worldwide professional and trade organization that provides an annual meeting and a peer-reviewed journal to promote research and education about PACS and related digital topics.

== See also ==
- DICOM
- Electronic Health Record (EHR)
- Electronic Medical Record (EMR)
- Enterprise Imaging
- Medical device
- Medical image sharing
- Medical imaging
- Medical software
- Radiographer
- Radiology
- Radiology Information System
- Teleradiology
- Vendor Neutral Archive (VNA)
- Visible Light Imaging
- X-ray
