= Financial security =

Financial security may refer to:

- Financial security system
- Economic security, the condition of having the resources to support a standard of living now and in the foreseeable future
- Security (finance), a financial negotiable instrument
