= Medical prescription =

Health-care communication from a physician to a pharmacist

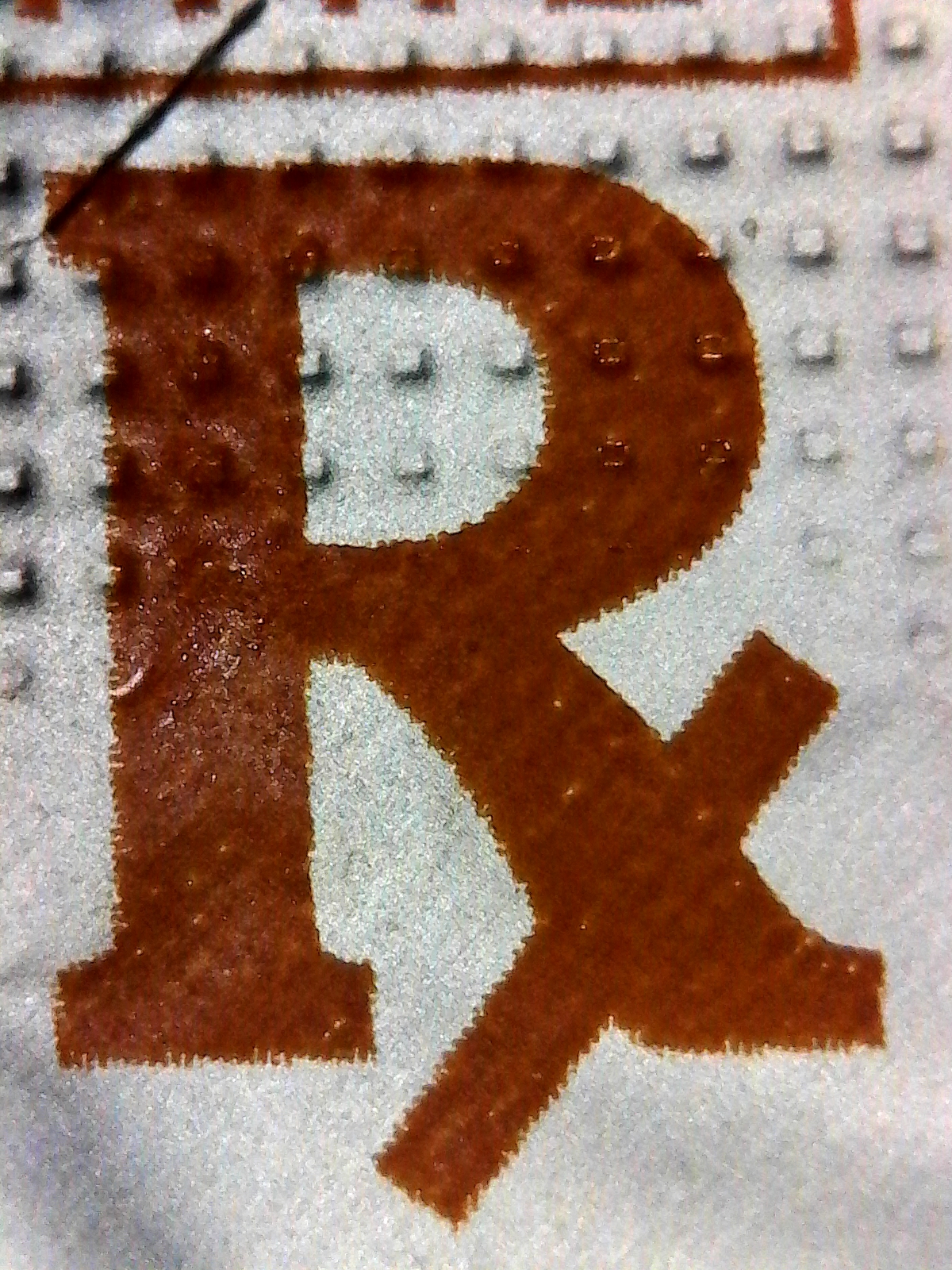
The internationally recognized prescription symbol, ℞ (U+211E), as printed on the blister pack of a prescription drug

Example medical prescription from North Rhine-Westphalia

A prescription in the medical context, often abbreviated as ℞ or Rx in North America, is a formal communication from physicians or other registered healthcare professionals to a pharmacist, authorizing them to dispense a specific prescription drug for a specific patient. Historically, it was a physician's instruction to an apothecary listing the materials to be compounded into a treatment—the symbol ℞ (a capital letter R, crossed to indicate abbreviation) comes from the first word of a medieval prescription, Latin recipe (lit. 'you take'), that gave the list of the materials to be compounded. Requirements for content, who may prescribe, and how prescriptions are transmitted vary by country; many jurisdictions use electronic prescribing systems.

== Definition and symbol ==
℞o

Medical prescription
- In Unicode: U+211E ℞ PRESCRIPTION TAKE (&rx;)

Different from
- Different from: U+0052 R LATIN CAPITAL LETTER R

Related
- See also: U+2695 ⚕ STAFF OF AESCULAPIUS

In law, a prescription in the medical context is a written or electronic order for a medicinal product or medical device issued by a health professional—such as a physician, physician assistant, dentist, or veterinarian—who is legally entitled to prescribe within the jurisdiction where it is issued. In pharmacy usage, the term prescription generally refers to instructions for medicines that patients obtain from a pharmacy or doctor's office and take themselves outside the hospital. This contrasts with medication orders, which are recorded in hospital or institutional charts to guide nurses and other staff in administering medicines directly to inpatients.

Prescriptions may be issued on paper, electronically, or, where it is permitted, verbally (e.g., by telephone). Paper prescriptions normally require the prescriber's handwritten signature and the date of issue. In some jurisdictions, a digital signature may be accepted, while prescriptions for controlled drugs often carry additional legal requirements, such as a handwritten signature, specified wording, or security features. Electronic prescriptions are accepted in many jurisdictions, and verbal prescriptions, when accepted, are subject to restrictions and read-back procedures to reduce error. The content of a prescription includes the name and address of the prescribing provider and any other legal requirements, such as a registration number (e.g., a DEA number in the United States). Unique to each prescription is the name of the patient. In the United Kingdom and Ireland, the patient's name and address must also be recorded. Each prescription is dated, and some jurisdictions may place a time limit on the prescription. Due to the addictive properties of certain drugs, incidents where security hackers have compromised online prescription accounts and employees have forged paper scripts to be sold on the black market have occurred. In the past, prescriptions contained instructions for the pharmacist to use for compounding the pharmaceutical product, but most prescriptions now specify pharmaceutical products that were manufactured and require little or no preparation by the pharmacist. Prescriptions also contain directions for the patient to follow when taking the drug. These directions are printed on the label of the pharmaceutical product.

The word prescription, from pre- ('before') and script ('writing, written'), refers to the fact that the prescription is an order that must be written down before a drug can be dispensed. Those within the industry will often call prescriptions simply "scripts". The symbol "℞", sometimes transliterated as "R_{x}" or "Rx", is recorded in 16th century manuscripts as an abbreviation of the late Latin instruction recipe, meaning 'receive'. (Note: Second person singular imperative form of recipere meaning "receive" or "take".) Originally abbreviated Rc, the later convention of using a slash to indicate abbreviation resulted in an R with a straight stroke through its right "leg". (Note: Compare with Pound sign#Origin. Transliteration as Rx is ubiquitous but erroneous, it is not an x.) (Note: Folk theories about the origin of the symbol "℞" note its similarity to the Eye of Horus, or to the ancient symbol for Zeus or Jupiter, (♃), gods whose protection may have been sought in medical contexts. No objective evidence has been produced for these theories.) Medieval prescriptions invariably began with the instruction from the physician to the apothecary to "take" certain materials and compound them in specified ways.

== Contents ==
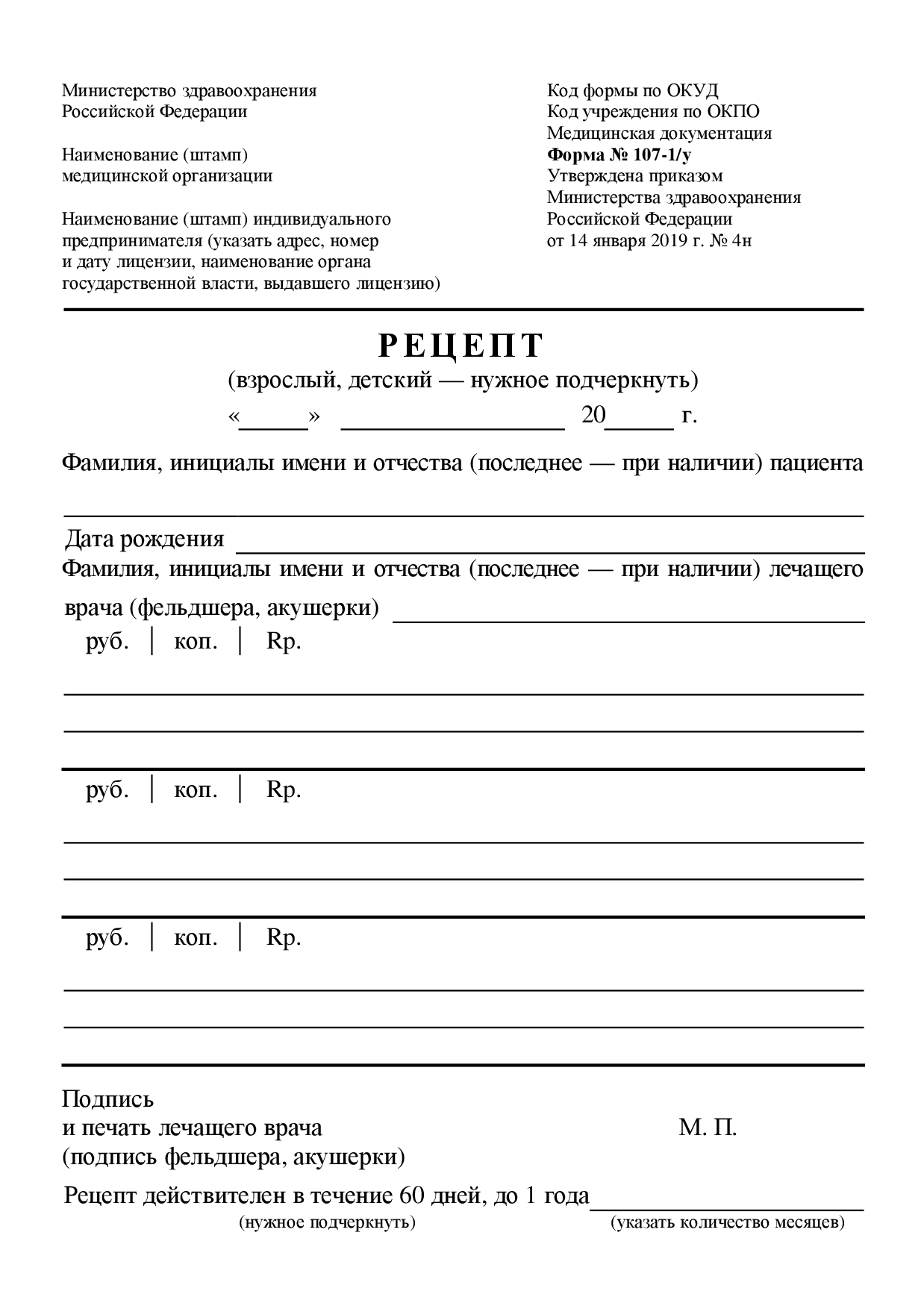
Sample prescription form No. 107 used in Russia (2019)

Every prescription contains who prescribed the prescription, who the prescription is valid for, and what is prescribed. Some jurisdictions, drug types or patient groups require additional information as explained below.

=== Drug equivalence and non-substitution ===
Many brand name drugs have cheaper generic drug substitutes that are therapeutically and biochemically equivalent. Prescriptions will also contain instructions on whether the prescriber will allow the pharmacist to substitute a generic version of the drug. This instruction is communicated in a number of ways. In some jurisdictions, the preprinted prescription contains two signature lines: one line has "dispense as written" printed underneath; the other line has "substitution permitted" underneath. Some have a preprinted box "dispense as written" for the prescriber to check off (but this is easily checked off by anyone with access to the prescription). In other jurisdictions, the protocol is for the prescriber to handwrite one of the following phrases: "dispense as written", "DAW", "brand necessary", "do not substitute", "no substitution", "medically necessary", "do not interchange". In Britain's National Health Service, doctors are reminded that money spent on branded rather than generic drugs is consequently not available for more deserving cases.

=== Dose regimen ===
The dose regimen is the planned schedule for administering a drug to a patient. It specifies the amount of drug given, how often it is administered, and the duration of treatment. The aim is to keep drug levels within the therapeutic range while avoiding adverse effects. A dose regimen typically includes:

- Dose size
- Dosing interval
- Duration of therapy
- Route of administration

Selection of an appropriate dose regimen is important for achieving therapeutic benefit. Incorrect dosing schedules may lead to treatment failure or drug toxicity, especially for medicines with a narrow therapeutic index.

=== Prescriptions for children ===
In some jurisdictions, it may be a legal requirement to include the age of child on the prescription. For pediatric prescriptions some advise the inclusion of the age of the child if the patient is less than twelve and the age and months if less than five. (In general, including the age on the prescription is helpful.) Adding the weight of the child is also helpful.

=== Label and instructions ===
Prescriptions in the US often have a "label" box. When checked, the pharmacist is instructed to label the medication and provide information about the prescription itself is given in addition to instructions on taking the medication. Otherwise, the patient is simply given the instructions. Some prescribers further inform the patient and pharmacist by providing the indication for the medication; i.e. what is being treated. This assists the pharmacist in checking for errors as many common medications can be used for multiple medical conditions. Some prescriptions will specify whether and how many "repeats" or "refills" are allowed; that is whether the patient may obtain more of the same medication without getting a new prescription from the medical practitioner. Regulations may restrict some types of drugs from being refilled.

== Writing prescriptions ==
=== Legal capacity to write prescriptions ===
National or local (e.g. US state or Canadian provincial) legislation governs who can write a prescription. In the United States, physicians (either M.D., D.O. or D.P.M.) have the broadest prescriptive authority. All 50 US states and the District of Columbia allow licensed certified Physician Assistants (PAs) prescription authority (with some states, limitations exist to controlled substances). All 50 US states and the District of Columbia, Puerto Rico and Guam allow registered certified nurse practitioners and other advanced practice registered nurses (such as certified nurse-midwives) prescription power (with some states including limitations to controlled substances). Many other healthcare professions also have prescriptive authority related to their area of practice. Veterinarians and dentists have prescribing power in all 50 US states and the District of Columbia for animals and for human diseases of the mouth, respectively. Clinical pharmacists are allowed to prescribe in some US states through the use of a drug formulary or collaboration agreements. Florida pharmacists can write prescriptions for a limited set of drugs. In all US states, optometrists prescribe medications to treat certain eye diseases, and also issue spectacle and contact lens prescriptions for corrective eyewear. Several US states have passed RxP legislation, allowing clinical psychologists who are registered as medical psychologists and have also undergone specialized training in script-writing, to prescribe drugs to treat emotional and mental disorders.

In January 2026, the US state of Utah announced it would allow artificial intelligence agents to autonomously, without physician input, to enable prescription renewals.

In August 2013, legislative changes in the UK allowed physiotherapists and podiatrists to have independent prescribing rights for licensed medicines that are used to treat conditions within their own area of expertise and competence. In 2018 this was extended to paramedics.

In Australia, registered nurses may prescribe under collaborative arrangements with an authorized prescriber, while in the United Kingdom, nurses, midwives, and pharmacists may prescribe if they complete an approved course and register their qualification. In other countries, such as Japan and South Korea, prescribing is restricted to physicians, dentists, and veterinarians. In South Korea, both physicians and pharmacists could prescribe and dispense medicines until July 2000.

=== Standing orders ===
Some jurisdictions allow certain physicians (sometimes a government official like the state Secretary of Health, sometimes physicians in local clinics or pharmacies) to write "standing orders" that act like a prescription for everyone in the general public. These orders also provide a standard procedure for determining if administration is necessary and details of how it is to be performed safely. These are typically used to authorize certain people to perform preventive, low-risk, or emergency care that would be otherwise logistically cumbersome to authorize for individual patients, including vaccinations, prevention of cavities, birth control, treatment of infectious diseases, and reversal of drug overdoses.

=== Legibility of handwritten prescriptions ===
Doctors' handwriting is a reference to the stereotypically illegible handwriting of some medical practitioners, which sometimes causes errors in dispensing. In the US, illegible handwriting has been indirectly responsible for at least 7,000 deaths annually.

Some jurisdictions have legislatively required prescriptions to be legible—Florida specifies "legibly printed or typed"—and the Institute for Safe Medication Practices advocated the elimination of handwritten prescriptions altogether. There have been numerous devices designed to electronically read the handwriting of doctors, including electronic character recognition, keyword spotters, and "postprocessing approaches", though the gradual shift to electronic health records and electronic prescriptions may alleviate the need for handwritten prescriptions altogether. In Britain's NHS, remaining paper prescriptions are almost invariably computer printed, and electronic (rather than paper) communication between surgery and pharmacy is increasingly the norm.

=== Conventions for avoiding ambiguity ===
Over the years, prescribers have developed many conventions for prescription-writing, with the goal of avoiding ambiguities or misinterpretation. These include:

- Careful use of decimal points to avoid ambiguity:
  - Avoiding unnecessary decimal points and trailing zeros, e.g. 5 mL rather than 5.0 mL.
  - Always using leading zeros on decimal numbers less than 1: e.g. 0.5 rather than .5 to avoid misinterpretation as 5.
- Directions written out in full in English (although some common Latin abbreviations are listed below).
- Quantities given directly or implied by the frequency and duration of the directions.
- Where the directions are "as needed", the quantity should always be specified.
- Where possible, usage directions should specify times (7 am, 3 pm, 11 pm) rather than simply frequency (three times a day) and especially relationship to meals for orally consumed medication.
- The use of permanent ink is encouraged.
- Avoiding units such as "teaspoons" or "tablespoons".
- Writing out numbers as words and numerals ("dispense #30 (thirty)") as in a bank draft or cheque.
- The use of the apothecaries' system or avoirdupois units and symbols of measure – pints (O), ounces (℥), drams (ℨ), scruples (℈), grains (gr), and minims (♏︎) – is discouraged given the potential for confusion. For example, the abbreviation for a grain ("gr") can be confused with the gram, abbreviated g, and the symbol for minims (♏︎), which looks almost identical to an "m", can be confused with micrograms or metres. Also, the symbols for ounce (℥) and dram (ℨ) can easily be confused with the numeral "3" and the Latin letter ezh, "Ʒ" and the symbol for pint (O) can be easily read as a "0". Given the potential for errors, metric equivalents should always be used.
- The degree symbol (°), which is commonly used as an abbreviation for hours (e.g., "q 2-4°" for every 2–4 hours), should not be used, since it can be confused with a "0" (zero). Further, the use of the degree symbol for primary, secondary, and tertiary (1°, 2°, and 3°) is discouraged, since the former could be confused with quantities (i.e. 10, 20 and 30, respectively).
- Micrograms are abbreviated "mcg" rather than "μg" (which, if handwritten, could easily be mistaken for "mg" (milligrams). Even so, pharmacists must be on the alert for inadvertent over- or under-prescribing through a momentary lapse of concentration.

=== Abbreviations ===
Many abbreviations are derived from Latin phrases. Hospital pharmacies have more abbreviations, some specific to the hospital. Different jurisdictions follow different conventions on what is abbreviated or not. Prescriptions that do not follow area conventions may be flagged as possible forgeries.

Some abbreviations that are ambiguous, or that in their written form might be confused with something else, are not recommended and should be avoided. These are flagged in the table in the main article. However, all abbreviations carry an increased risk for confusion and misinterpretation and should be used cautiously.

== Non-prescription drug prescriptions ==
Over-the-counter medications and non-controlled medical supplies such as dressings, which do not require a prescription, may also be prescribed. Depending upon a jurisdiction's medical system, non-prescription drugs may be prescribed because drug benefit plans may reimburse the patient only if the over-the-counter medication is taken at the direction of a qualified medical practitioner. In the countries of the UK, National Health Service (NHS) prescriptions are either free or have a fixed price per item; a prescription may be issued so the patient does not have to purchase the item at commercial price.

Some medical software requires a prescription.

Legislation may define certain equipment as "prescription devices". Such prescription devices can only be used under the supervision of authorized personnel and such authorization is typically documented using a prescription. Examples of prescription devices include dental cement (for affixing braces to tooth surfaces), various prostheses, gut sutures, sickle cell tests, cervical cap and ultrasound monitor.

In some jurisdictions, hypodermic syringes are in a special class of their own, regulated as illicit drug use accessories separate from regular medical legislation. Such legislation often allows syringes to be dispensed only with a prescription.

Prescriptions for healthy foods, such as fruits and vegetables, have been proposed as a simple and cost-effective way to improve a patient's health.

== History ==
The idea of prescriptions dates back to the beginning of history. So long as there were medications and a writing system to capture directions for preparation and usage, there were prescriptions. The oldest known medical prescription text was found at Ebla, in modern Syria, and dates back to around 2500 BCE.

Modern prescriptions are actually extemporaneous prescriptions (from the Latin ex tempore, 'at/from the time'), meaning that the prescription is written on the spot for a specific patient with a specific ailment. This is distinguished from a non-extemporaneous prescription that is a generic recipe for a general ailment. Modern prescriptions evolved with the separation of the role of the pharmacists from that of the physician. Today the term extemporaneous prescriptions is reserved for compound prescriptions that requires the pharmacist to mix or compound the medication in the pharmacy for the specific needs of the patient.

Predating modern legal definitions of a prescription, a prescription traditionally is composed of four parts: a superscription, inscription, subscription, and signature.

The superscription section contains the date of the prescription and patient information (name, address, age, etc.). The symbol "℞" separates the superscription from the inscriptions sections. In this arrangement of the prescription, the "℞" is a symbol for recipe or literally the imperative "take!" This is an exhortation to the pharmacist by the medical practitioner, "I want the patient to have the following medication" – in other words, "take the following components and compound this medication for the patient".

The inscription section defines what is the medication. The inscription section is further composed of one or more of:

- a basis or chief ingredient intended to cure (curare)
- an adjuvant to assist its action and make it cure quickly (cito)
- a corrective to prevent or lessen any undesirable effect (tuto)
- a vehicle or excipient to make it suitable for administration and pleasant to the patient (jucunde)

The subscription section contains dispensing directions to the pharmacist. This may be compounding instructions or quantities.

The signature section contains directions to the patient and is often abbreviated "Sig." or "Signa." It also obviously contains the signature of the prescribing medical practitioner though the word signature has two distinct meanings here and the abbreviations are sometimes used to avoid confusion.

Thus sample prescriptions in modern textbooks are often presented as:

Rx:  medication
Disp.:  dispensing instructions
Sig.: patient instructions

== Use of technology ==
As a prescription is nothing more than information among a prescriber, pharmacist and patient, information technology can be applied to it. Existing information technology is adequate to print out prescriptions. Hospital information systems in some hospitals do away with prescriptions within the hospital. There are proposals to securely transmit the prescription from the prescriber to the pharmacist using smartcard or the internet. In the UK, a project called the Electronic Transfer of Prescriptions (ETP) within the National Programme for IT (NPfIT) piloted such a scheme between prescribers and pharmacies.

Within computerized pharmacies, the information on paper prescriptions is recorded into a database. Afterwards, the paper prescription is archived for storage and legal reasons.

A pharmacy chain is often linked together through corporate headquarters with computer networking. A person who has a prescription filled at one branch can get a refill of that prescription at any other store in the chain, as well as have their information available for new prescriptions at any branch.

Some online pharmacies also offer services to customers over the internet, allowing users to specify the store that they will pick up the medicine from. Many pharmacies provide services to ship prescription refills to the patient's home. They also offer mail service where a customer can mail in a new, original prescription and a signed document, and they will ship the filled prescription back.

Pharmacy information systems are a potential source of information for pharmaceutical companies, as it contains information about the prescriber's prescribing habits. Prescription data mining of such data is a developing, specialized field.

Many prescribers lack the digitized information systems that reduce prescribing errors. To reduce these errors, some investigators have developed modified prescription forms that prompt the prescriber to provide all the desired elements of a good prescription. The modified forms also contain predefined choices such as common quantities, units and frequencies that the prescriber may circle rather than write out. Such forms are thought to reduce errors, especially omission and handwriting errors and are actively under evaluation.

== See also ==
- Eyeglass prescription – Order written by an eyewear prescriber
- Inverse benefit law – Drug benefit-harm ratio falls with marketing
- Medicines reconciliation
- Off-label use – Use of pharmaceuticals for conditions different from that for which they were approved
- Prescription analytics
- Prescription charges – Charges for medical prescriptions on the UK NHS, and in Ireland
- Private prescription
- Referral
- Special prescription form – Form for the prescription of controlled narcotics
