= HBSS =

HBSS may refer to:

- Hanks' Balanced Salt Solution, a saline solution used to keep the osmotic pressure and pH in cells
- Host Based Security System, software applications used within the United States Department of Defense to monitor, detect and counterattacks against the Department of Defense computer networks and systems.
