= Software safety classification =

Software installed in medical devices is assessed for health and safety issues according to international standards.

== Safety classes ==
Software classification is based on the potential for hazard(s) that could cause injury to the user or patient.

Per IEC 62304:2006 + A1:2015, the software can be divided into three separate classes: class A, B, and C.

- The SOFTWARE SYSTEM is software safety class A if:
  - the SOFTWARE SYSTEM cannot contribute to a HAZARDOUS SITUATION; or
  - the SOFTWARE SYSTEM can contribute to a HAZARDOUS SITUATION which does not result in unacceptable RISK after consideration of RISK CONTROL measures external to the SOFTWARE SYSTEM.
- The SOFTWARE SYSTEM is software safety class B if:
  - the SOFTWARE SYSTEM can contribute to a HAZARDOUS SITUATION which results in unacceptable RISK after consideration of RISK CONTROL measures external to the SOFTWARE SYSTEM and the resulting possible HARM is non-SERIOUS INJURY.
- The SOFTWARE SYSTEM is software safety class C if:
  - the SOFTWARE SYSTEM can contribute to a HAZARDOUS SITUATION which results in unacceptable RISK after consideration of RISK CONTROL measures external to the SOFTWARE SYSTEM and the resulting possible HARM is death or SERIOUS INJURY“

=== Serious injury ===
For the purpose of this classification, serious injury is defined as injury or illness that directly or indirectly is life-threatening; results in permanent impairment of a body function or permanent damage to a body structure; or necessitates medical or surgical intervention to prevent permanent impairment of a body function or permanent damage to a body structure.
