= Co-pay card =

The co-pay card (also called a copay card or copay coupon) is a form of manufacturer-sponsored copay assistance that reduces a patient’s cost-sharing (e.g., copayments, coinsurance, or deductibles) for certain prescription drugs at the point of sale. These programs are most commonly offered for brand-name drugs, often specialty drugs, and typically apply to people with commercial health insurance. Program details and eligibility rules vary by manufacturer and by drug. As of January 2017, in the United States, coupon cards for more than 600 prescription medications are available.

Based on the National Council for Prescription Drug Programs standard, all pharmacy software systems contain information fields for both a primary and secondary insurer to pay for patient's prescription.

== Process ==
Typically, a patient will receive his/her co-pay card from their physician along with a prescription for the medicine. The patient takes the card and prescription to a pharmacy where the pharmacist enters processing information into his/her pharmacy management system to submit a claim.

If a patient has insurance, the pharmacist will key in the patient's insurance number in the primary field and an identifier from the co-pay card into the secondary insurer field. Instantaneously the pharmacy benefit manager provides coverage data, relaying the patient's out of pocket, or co-pay to the secondary insurer's benefit manager, who then provides a discount accordingly.

An example: A brand offers a co-pay card giving patients the opportunity to save up to $20 off each prescription fill. A patient receives the co-pay card and visits their pharmacy. The patient provides his/her insurance card and co-pay card to the pharmacist. The pharmacist enters information into his/her pharmacy management system from both cards. The insurance benefit manager recognizes the drug as a TIER 3 brand for the patient and relays the patient co-pay to be $30.00. The co-pay card benefit manager recognizes the $30.00 and covers the $20.00 of co-pay, leaving $10 for the patient to pay out of pocket. Another patient without prescription insurance coverage follows the same process. The co-pay card takes the primary insurer position where it recognizes the claim as that of a cash-paying patient and applies $20.00 discount to the patient's out-of-pocket costs.

== Effects ==
Research has found that copay coupons can increase utilization of brand-name drugs in settings where bioequivalent generics are available, potentially reducing generic substitution and increasing total spending.

== Variations ==
In most cases the service provider of the co-pay card program holds a reimbursement account for the pharmaceutical marketing client, which is used to remit to pharmacies the cost reductions through co-pay card programs. The co-pay service provider remits to pharmacies every 14 to 28 days and deducts these remittances via this account.

Some providers have attempted a variation on the original co-pay card by going to a magnetic strip swipe process, by which the card runs through both the pharmacy software and financial software (e.g. Visa/MasterCard and Debit networks).

Debit cards are another reimbursement method for co-pay in pharmacies because they offer real-time reimbursement of co-pay claims. However, with new prompt-pay regulations for adjudicators, required for Medicare Part D and implemented by most PBMs, few pharmacies wait more than one week for reimbursement. Pharmacies used to prefer real-time Debit payments because they did not require the pharmacies to carry the "float" of the 14 to 28 days payment cycles. This is no longer true.

== Copay adjustment programs ==
Some insurers and pharmacy benefit managers use copay adjustment programs (including accumulator and maximizer programs) that change whether, or how, manufacturer assistance counts toward a patient’s deductible or annual out-of-pocket maximum, which can affect patients’ net costs over the benefit year.
