= IEC 62304 =

International standard for medical software

IEC 62304 Medical device software – Software life cycle processes is an international standard published by the International Electrotechnical Commission (IEC). The standard specifies life cycle requirements for the development and maintenance of medical device software and software within medical devices. It has been adopted as national standards and therefore can be used as a benchmark to comply with regulatory requirements.

IEC 62304 was first published in 2006 and amended in 2015. The consolidated version, IEC 62304:2006 + AMD1:2015, incorporates the original standard and Amendment 1. The standard was reviewed and confirmed in 2023.

== Implications of IEC 62304 for software ==
IEC 62304 addresses the use of software of unknown provenance (SOUP), which includes pre-existing software components developed without adequate records of their development processes. Such components may include third-party or off-the-shelf-software.

The standard specified requirements for identifying SOUP components, documenting applicable requirements, evaluating known anomalies, and managing risks associated with their use. The applicable activities depend on the software safety classification.

=== General requirements ===
- Quality management system
- Risk management
- Software safety classification

=== Software development process ===
- Software development planning
- Software requirements analysis
- Software architectural design
- Software detailed design
- Software unit implementation and verification
- Software integration and integration testing
- Software system testing
- Software release

=== Software lifecycle activities by safety class ===
IEC 62304 defines three software safety classes (A, B, and C) based on the risk of harm associated with hazardous situations to which the software may contribute, taking into account risk control measures external to the software system.

- Class A: the software cannot contribute to a hazardout situation, or any resulting risk is acceptable after external risk control measures have been considered
- Class B: the software can contribute to a hazardous situation involving unacceptable risk, with the possibility of non-serious injury
- Class C: the software can contribute to a hazardous situation involving unacceptable risk, with the possibility of death or serious injury.

Software documentation	Class A	Class B	Class C
Software development planning	X	X	X
Software requirements analysis	X	X	X
Software architectural design		X	X
Software detailed design			X
Software unit implementation	X	X	X
Software unit verification		X	X
Software integration and integration testing		X	X
Software system testing	X	X	X
Software release	X	X	X
X - required

=== Software maintenance process ===
- Establish software maintenance plan
- Problem and modification analysis
- Modification implementation

=== Software risk management process ===
- Analysis of software contributing to hazardous situations
- Risk control measures
- Verification of risk control measures
- Risk management of software changes

=== Software configuration management process ===
- Configuration identification
- Change control
- Configuration status accounting

=== Software problem resolution process ===
- Prepare problem reports
- Investigate the problem
- Advise relevant parties
- Use change control process
- Maintain records
- Analyse problems for trends
- Verify software problem resolution
- Test documentation contents

== Relationship to other standards ==
IEC 62304 is intended to be applied within a broader medical quality management and risk management framework. The standard requires manufacturers to apply a risk management process conforming to ISO 14971. ISO 13485 provides requirements for quality management systems used by medical device organisations and is one means of demonstrating the quality management system capability required by IEC 62304.

== See also ==
- List of IEC standards
- IEC 60601 — safety and essential performance of medical electrical equipment
- ISO 9001 — quality management systems: requirements
- CISQ, Consortium for IT Software Quality
- Therac-25 a computer-controlled radiation therapy machine, which was one prompt for IEC 62304
- Time-triggered system (a software architecture that is used in many safety-critical systems)
