= Economic anxiety =

Concern about future economic prospects

Economic anxiety, also referred to as economic insecurity, is the state of concern about the future of one's economic prospects, owing to low economic security. Economic anxiety can increase due to loss of household income or decreased purchasing power, causing affected individuals to self-report having more issues with societal structure and a lower quality of life. Anxiety occurs when the idea of a situation is regarded as highly threatening, unpleasant and doubtful, motivating individuals to stay away from insecurity by creating an environment that is safe in order to protect themselves and their families from threatening groups and events (Jarymowicz & Bar-Tal, 2006; Nabi, 1999; Roseman & Evdokas, 2004).

Events in the life of an individual such as unemployment, divorce, or a serious illness can also trigger decreased income, and by result, economic anxiety. Research has shown that high levels of economic insecurity exist among low-income households, and that economic anxiety has a positive correlation with growing economic inequality in the United States. This was due to larger family instability and volatility in income in the United States in the 2000s as compared to 1960s. Economic insecurity could originate from the perception one holds towards social stratification (which inspects risks of job loss, distribution of income and downward mobility) and changes in their economic status. Furthermore, single-parent families are more vulnerable to losing jobs than two-parent families because it takes time to digest and absorb the shock of uncertainty (Western et al. 2008). Moreover, economic insecurity is associated with suicide/ suicidal thoughts, heart diseases, psychological disorders and physiological illness and the reason why this could be triggered could be because of economic policies.

== Social and physical effects of economic anxiety ==
There are a myriad of adverse physical and social conditions that research correlates with individuals who feel economic anxiety. Higher levels of economic anxiety have been shown to be positively correlated with a fear of crime. When faced with economic anxiety, individuals are more likely to smoke cigarettes as a "self-medicating" coping mechanism. The reason why there is a positive correlation between the increase in smoking and economic anxiety is because agonists of nicotine receptors enhances mood and cognition. Moreover, anxiety tend to trigger various fear in an individual and influence the degree to which they attempt to avoid/escape pain. Hence, smoking cigarette helps cope with physiological distress and the expectancy that smoking decreases anxiety, as a result of witnessing other smokers and their experience with drugs/substances. Studies have shown even a 1 percent increase in the chances of becoming unemployed make an individual 2.4 percent more likely to start or continue smoking. Researchers have also found that economic anxiety causes people to gain weight, and that economic anxiety self-reinforces obesity. In one study, a .01 percent increase in chances of becoming unemployed caused average weight gain over a 12-year period to increase by about 0.6 pounds. Each 50% decrease in annual income caused average weight gain for that 12-year period to increase by an extra 5 pounds.

Studies have also found that economic insecurity causes physical pain and reduces pain tolerance levels. When individuals lose their jobs, contemplate unemployment levels in their home state or neighbourhood, or even when they contemplate past or future economic insecurity, pain levels rise. One reason behind the increase in the level of pain could be the fact that economic anxiety triggers feelings of lack of control as the foundation of human motivation is built mainly on having stability in life (Kelley, 1971; Landau, Kay & Whitson, 2015). To further add on, economic anxiety can damage one's self-esteem, impair cognitive functioning and people become more prone to various illness such as heart diseases and psychiatric disorders. This suggests that just the prospect, or idea, of economic loss can also be harmful to health. Relative preference theories state that an individual's use of income is parallel to their past income (adaptive expectations) or corresponding to other people (reference people). Therefore, raising the income of all doesn't necessarily mean greater happiness if other people belonging from the same reference group also have a similar salary (Dorn et al., 2007, Ferrer-i-Carbonell, 2005, Luttmer, 2005, Weinzierl, 2005). On the other hand, absolute utility theory presumes that higher income can fulfil more needs indicating a positive correlation with an increase in happiness (Veenhoven, 1991).

== Measuring economic anxiety ==
To measure economic anxiety, surveys measure not only financial anxiety, which relates to a person's anxiety about finances on a personal, individual level but also individuals' feelings surrounding the nation's economy. The Marketplace-Edison Research Poll surveys the economic anxiety of Americans regularly. How individual answers the questions in the Marketplace-Edison Research Poll determines their Economic Anxiety Index, which is a number ranging from 1-100 designed to represent a person's stress related to the economy. The research poll and Index center on 12 questions regarding job security, savings and expenses, and general financial anxiety. The higher a person scores on the Economic Anxiety Index, the more concerned they are said to be about the state of their personal finances and the national economy. Surveys of Americans using the Economic Anxiety Index over time have shown there are strong divisions in economic anxiety between pay grades. Hourly workers have far more economic anxiety than salaried workers, and renters tend to be more stressed financially than those with home mortgages.

An index of economic well-being is another method and has four components: income distribution, consumption, economic security and accumulation. The scale compares the GDP per individual against the economic well-being while seeing the differences in performance between various countries. People seek pleasure through consumption and savings for future generations. As the well-being of future generation depends on the inheritance of physical capital stock, assets, natural and human resources to build a sense of society. And in the long-run, it will guarantee sustainability in the economy.

Another approach used by economists and psychologists is subjective well-being report (SWB) to find out how an individual feels and thinks about their life. As it helps economists and psychologists gain insight into the effect of income, relative income, inflation and unemployment. People were asked to rate themselves where they think they stand on the ladder for one being on the poorest level in their community and 10 being on the richest level in their community. Individuals judge themselves based on the standard of living in their own country (Graham and Felton, 2016). Moreover, well-being and life satisfaction rises as the number of hours increases as it provides a sense of job security.

== Examples of economic anxiety in recent years ==
The role of economic anxiety among working-class whites was a hot topic following Trump's presidential election in 2016. According to the News on the Web database, use of economic anxiety peaked on American news platforms in November 2016. Economic anxiety has been widely cited (e.g. by commentators at FiveThirtyEight) as a major reason for Donald Trump's victory in the 2016 U.S. presidential election. Other commentators argued that economic anxiety was less of an important factor in predicting support for Trump than cultural anxiety, or the feeling that one is a stranger in America and that illegal immigrants should be deported. In addition, there was a positive correlation between income and support for Trump in 2016; Hillary Clinton won among those with incomes under $50,000, while Trump won among those with incomes above $50,000, according to exit polls. The term has also been used sarcastically in response to racist statements and actions by Trump's supporters, to mock the attempts by certain political commentators to argue that support for Trump is due to concern about their economic prospects, not to racist attitudes.

Some fear now that economic anxiety spurred on by the COVID-19 pandemic will cause a long-term economic downturn worldwide. In May 2020, the Marketplace-Edison Research Poll found that 44% of Americans were concerned about whether they could afford groceries and that economic anxiety had increased in all demographics since 2019, save those who made less than $25,000 per year in 2020 and the previous year. Recently, several research papers have shown that the abrupt distortion and chaos caused around the world due to the on-going COVID-19 pandemic has led to an increase in levels of depression, anxiety, suicide and other symptoms of stress. One survey indicated that individuals tend to feel anxious if their workloads decrease or increase because the change in work routines causes stress and pressure. Moreover, a growing number of COVID cases in a country induces distress, dissatisfaction and anxiety as this will result in a longer period of lockdown which will slow down the economic growth. The pandemic has left almost 400 million people around the world jobless with a decline in $8.5 trillion in the economy in 2 years time. Mental health problems are rising greatly amongst younger generations as they believe that they are missing out on factors like industrialisation and urbanization, also loses like home, family relations, a threat to their health can all majorly impact long-term deterioration in mental health. Therefore, policy-makers and governments are trying to provide full support like increasing mental health services, financial packages, loans, expanding unemployment insurance, etc. to help individuals better cope with economic insecurity.

Thirdly, immigrants in a country can trigger anxiety and rage onto minority groups, especially during recession periods as individuals fear the increased competition for an inadequate amount of supply while also reducing job opportunities and increasing levels of taxes. Moreover, anxiety is an intuitive, emotional response when it comes to immigrants as it poses threat to physical safety in the United States. People process information through information seeking, attention and engagement. Firstly, individuals seek biased information towards immigrants and rely heavily on threatening news which further adds to their economic anxiety. Secondly, people tend to easily remember and favour terrifying news over non-threatening news leading to biased information processing, evaluation and opinion. And once they develop the fear, they continue to pay close attention to frightening information to changes in policies. To add on, immigrant policies are frowned upon because of stereotypical beliefs on the intelligence and work ethic of a different group, mainly amongst white people. The condition of the economy influences stereotypical thinking varies across different cultures. Another factor affecting economic anxiety could be the quality and level of education achieved. As it is believed that the more educated an individual is the less affected they would be with an economic downturn. Hence, they will have a more open-mind towards immigration policies and will show less racist attitudes than the less educated people. The reason behind this could be because higher-income individuals feel more secure about their jobs than the poor.

== See also ==
- Economic inequality
- Precariat
- The 99%
- Socioeconomic status and mental health
- Universal basic income
