= Economic security =

Socioeconomic and personal finance concept

Economic security or financial security is the condition of having stable income or other resources to support a standard of living now and in the foreseeable future. It includes:

- probable continued solvency
- predictability of the future cash flow of a person or other economic entity, such as a country
- employment security or job security

Without such security, people may experience its opposite: economic insecurity and resulting economic anxiety.

Financial security more often refers to individual and family money management and savings. Economic security tends to include the broader effect of a society's production levels and monetary support for non-working citizens.

== Components of individual economic security ==
In the United States, children's economic security is indicated by the income level and employment security of their families or organizations. Economic security of people over 50 years old is based on Social Security benefits, pensions and savings, earnings and employment, and health insurance coverage.

The Federal Reserve's 2025 Survey of Household Economics and Decisionmaking reported that 73 percent of U.S. adults said they were doing okay financially or living comfortably. In the same survey, 63 percent said they would cover a hypothetical $400 emergency expense entirely with cash, savings, or a credit card paid in full at the next statement, while 55 percent reported enough emergency savings to cover three months of expenses.

=== Arizona ===
In 1972, the state legislature of Arizona formed a Department of Economic Security with a mission to promote "the safety, well-being, and self sufficiency of children, adults, and families". This department combines state government activities previously managed by the Employment Security Commission, the State Department of Public Welfare, the Division of Vocational Rehabilitation, the State Office of Economic Opportunity, the Apprenticeship Council, and the State Office of Manpower Planning. The State Department of Mental Retardation (renamed the Division of Developmental Disabilities, House Bill 2213) joined the department in 1974 . The purpose in creating the department was to provide an integration of direct services to people in such a way as to reduce duplication of administrative efforts, services and expenditures. Family Connections became a part of the department in January 2007.

=== Minnesota ===
The Minnesota Department of Economic Security was formed in 1977 from the departments of Employment Services and Vocational Rehabilitation, the Governor's Manpower Office, and the Economic Opportunity Office, which administered anti-poverty programs. In 1985, State Services for the Blind was included in this department. In 2003, the Minnesota Department of Economic Security and Minnesota Department of Trade and Economic Development were merged to form The Minnesota Department of Employment and Economic Development.

== National economic security ==
In the context of domestic politics and international relations, national economic security is the ability of a country to follow its choice of policies to develop the national economy in the manner desired. Historically, conquest of nations have made conquerors rich through plunder, access to new resources and enlarged trade through controlling of the economies of conquered nations. Today's complex system of international trade is characterized by multi-national agreements and mutual inter-dependence. Availability of natural resources and capacity for production and distribution are essential under this system, leading many experts to consider economic security to be as important a part of national security as military policy.

Economic security has been proposed as a key determinant of international relations, particularly in the geopolitics of petroleum in American foreign policy after 1973 oil crisis and September 11, 2001.

In Canada, threats to the country's overall economic security are considered economic espionage, which is "illegal, clandestine or coercive activity by a foreign government in order to gain unauthorized access to economic intelligence, such as proprietary information or technology, for economic advantage."

In January 2021, the United States Department of Homeland Security (DHS) issued Strategic Action Plan to Counter the Threat Posed by China.

In October 2021 in Japan, prime minister Fumio Kishida created the first-ever ministerial post for economic security. And in April 2022, Japan's National Diet passed an economic security bill aimed at guarding technology and reinforcing critical supply chains, while also imposing tighter oversight of Japanese firms working in sensitive sectors or critical infrastructure. Measures in the legislation, which is primarily aimed at warding off risks from China, will be implemented over two years once it is enacted, according to the bill.

In March 2023, Japan and Germany agreed to strengthen cooperation on economic security in the aftermath of tensions over global supply chains and the economic impact of Russian invasion of Ukraine. In the first high-ministerial government consultations held between the two countries, German Chancellor Olaf Scholz reached out to Tokyo to seek to reduce Germany's dependence on China for imports of raw materials.

On April 4, 2023, a G7 Trade Ministers' Meeting via video conference was held to discuss on enhancing economic security, and a G7 Trade Ministers' Statement was issued on the day. Also in April 2023, Japan's Public Security Intelligence Agency (PSIA) launched a division dedicated to economic security. The agency also plans to set up such dedicated units in its regional bureaus nationwide to step up efforts to prevent cutting-edge technology and data from being leaked out of the country. On 20 May 2023 on occasion of the G7 Hiroshima summit, economic security was discussed for the first time as the G7 agenda, and "G7 Leaders' Statement on Economic Resilience and Economic Security" was issued based on the discussion.

On 20 June 2023, the European Commission and the High Representative proposed a Joint Communication on a European Economic Security Strategy which will be discussed by EU leaders at their meeting.

On 12 December 2025 the U.S. announced Pax Silica, an initiative for strengthening and coordinating "trusted" supply chains for advanced technologies, and using those strong economic ties to increase national security.

== Other ==
It is widely believed that there is a tradeoff between economic security and economic opportunity.

== See also ==
Individual economic security

- Basic needs
- Citizen's dividend
- Financial intelligence
- Guaranteed minimum income
- Living wage
- Precariat
- Social credit
- Social dividend
- Social policy
- Social safety net
- Universal basic income

National economic security

- Digital supply chain security
- Dual-use technology
- Economic warfare
- 2020–2023 global chip shortage
