= Non-developmental item =

Term used in government procurement

Non-developmental item (NDI) is a term used for products procured by the United States federal government which do not require further development or require only minimal modification. Commercial-off-the-shelf (COTS) and government-off-the-shelf (GOTS) are two subtypes of NDI.

== Overview ==
The term was first coined in 1986 by the US Congress. According to the Federal Acquisition Regulation, a non-developmental item is:

- Any previously developed item of supply used exclusively for governmental purposes by a Federal agency, a State or local government, or a foreign government with which the United States has a mutual defense cooperation agreement;
- Any item described in paragraph (1) of this definition that requires only minor modification or modifications of a type customarily available in the commercial marketplace in order to meet the requirements of the procuring department or agency; or
- Any item of supply being produced that does not meet the requirements of paragraphs (1) or (2) solely because the item is not yet in use.

The third definition can apply to fully developed items in production but not for commercial sale yet. In this way, the US Federal government can "capture" a product or technology for use before it becomes commercially available.

One subtype of non-developmental items is the military-purpose non-developmental item, defined as:

- A nondevelopmental item that meets a validated military requirement as determined in writing by the responsible program manager and has been developed exclusively at private expense. An item shall not be considered to be developed at private expense if development of the item was paid for in whole or in part through -
  - Independent research and development costs or bid and proposal costs, per the definition in FAR 31.205-18, that have been reimbursed directly or indirectly by a Federal agency or have been submitted to a Federal agency for reimbursement; or
  - Foreign government funding

== Considerations ==
NDIs are advantageous in several ways. As the product is already designed and in production, the government does not have to spend funds for research and development. Testing and evaluation have already been completed by the company, further speeding the acquisition cycle. The use of NDI COTS products also can offer improved pricing, wider variety, and access to cutting-edge technology. However, there can be multiple disadvantages as well. Companies may not provide complete technical documentation, and their internal testing may not fully meet government standards. The product itself may not meet all government requirements, and modification may be complicated or cost prohibitive.

== See also ==
- Contract management
- Contract awarding
