= High-integrity software =

Software

High-integrity software is software whose failure may cause serious damage with possible "life-threatening consequences". "Integrity is important as it demonstrates the safety, security, and maintainability of code." Examples of high-integrity software are nuclear reactor control, avionics software, automotive safety-critical software and process control software.

[H]igh integrity means that the code:

- Does what it should.
- Can be tested.
- Has security features.
- Lacks security vulnerabilities.
- Is easy to understand and follow logically.
- Is easy to edit and upgrade without introducing new errors.

A number of standards are applicable to high-integrity software, including:

- DO-178C, Software Considerations in Airborne Systems and Equipment Certification
- CENELEC EN 50128, Railway applications – Communication, signalling and processing systems – Software for railway control and protection systems
- IEC 61508, Functional Safety of Electrical/Electronic/Programmable Electronic Safety-related Systems (E/E/PE, or E/E/PES)
- ISO 26262, Road Vehicles – Functional Safety (especially 'part 6' of the standard, which is titled "Product development at the software level"

== See also ==
- Ada (programming language)
- Safety-critical system
- High availability software
- Formal methods
- Software of unknown pedigree
