= Software of unknown pedigree =

Software whose safety cannot be relied upon

Software of unknown pedigree (SOUP) is a pre-existing software which development process or safety-related properties are not sufficiently documented or known.

== SOUP in medical device software ==
The term SOUP is discussed in the context of safety-critical and high-integrity systems such as medical software – especially in a medical device. In the medical device development standard IEC 62304, SOUP is defined more specifically as software of unknown provenance and includes generally available software not originally developed for incorporation into a medical device, as well as previosuly developed software lacking adequate development process records.

SOUP poses a risk when used for safety-related functions. It may prevent other software, hardware, or firmware from performing their safety-related functions. But classification as SOUP does not necessarily indicate that a software component is defective or unsafe.

Addressing this risk involves insulating the safety-involved parts of a system from potential undesirable effects. Rather than prohibiting SOUP, organizations often impose additional controls to mitigate risk. Practices may include static program analysis and review of the vendor's development process, design artifacts, and safety guidance.

Under the IEC 62304, manufacturers must identify SOUP components used in medical device software and maintain appropriate configuration records. Depending on the applicable software safety class, additional activities include specifying functional and performance requirements, documenting the hardware and software environment needed for proper operation, and evaluating known anomalies that could contribute to hazardous situations.

These requirements are addressed in several clauses of IEC 62304, including 5.3.3., 5.3.4., 7.1.3., and 8.1.2.

== SOUP and OTS/COTS ==
SOUP is closely related to the use off-the-shelf (OTS) and commercial off-the-shelf-software (COTS) software in medical devices. OTS refers to generally available software components, such as operating systems, third-party libraries, and other pre-exising components integrated into a medical device. COTS is a commercialy supplied category of off-the-shelf software.

The terminology differs between regulatory and standarization frameworks. The U.S. Food and Drug Administration (FDA) primarly uses the term OTS, whereas SOUP comes from the IEC 62304.

Although these concepts overlap, they are not entirely interchangeable. OTS primarly decribes software availability and the manufacturer's control over its development lifecycle, while SOUP classification considers the software's original purpose and development documentation.
