= Financial security system =

A financial security system finances unknown future obligations. Such a system involves an arrangement between a provider, who agrees to pay the future obligations, often in return for payments from a person or institution who wish to avoid undesirable economic consequences of uncertain future obligations. Financial security systems include insurance products as well as retirement plans and warranties.

== Actuarial context ==
In actuarial science, a financial security system is understood as a system that manages risks with future economic consequences. The Society of Actuaries has described financial security systems as involving the transfer of actuarial risks that have future economic consequences, often emerging over many years and therefore requiring both short-term and long-term perspectives.

Within this framework, actuaries analyze how such systems are designed, financed, and managed in order to reduce financial insecurity arising from uncertain events. The Society of Actuaries’ educational materials describe actuaries as focusing on the objectives of the financial security system and on the risks that need to be identified and managed within it.
