= Private prescription =

The term private prescription is a term used in the United Kingdom for a medical prescription which is not supplied under the National Health Service (NHS).

Unlike for NHS prescription there is no special stationery as mandated by the General Medical Council; a private prescription can be printed, handwritten or created electronically by an authorised prescriber on any piece of paper or regulatory compliant electronic system such as Clynxx. The exception is that since July 2006, the Department of Health has required private prescriptions for a Controlled Drug to be prescribed on specified paperwork, the FP10PCD.

A patient usually has to pay a fee to a private practice doctor, and then pay the dispensing pharmacy for the medicine; the price may be more or less than the standard NHS prescription charge. The charge for the medication is based on cost price and markup, as is usual in retail, plus a dispensing fee. The NHS prescription charge in England is a standard fee which is not related to the cost of the drug or quantity supplied; there is no charge for NHS prescriptions in Northern Ireland, Scotland, or Wales.

== Electronic Private Prescriptions ==
In the UK, a private prescription does not need to be handwritten and can be created electronically. Prescribers can create regulatory compliant electronic private prescriptions using the official system Clynxx or other regulatory compliant systems. For a prescription to be compliant as an electronic prescription, it must meet the requirements set in The Human Medicines Regulations 2012. As of 23 November 2021, Schedule 2 and 3 controlled drugs cannot be prescribed electronically for private prescriptions and must be prescribed on the NHS issued FP10PCD (pink forms) which must be submitted to the NHSBSA "no later than the fifth day of the month following which they were supplied."

In June 2023, it was revealed that "only two [electronic private prescription] software developers [were] fully compliant with regulatory requirements". This was following an investigation by the UK Pharmacy Safety Group on the 'Risks to Public Safety' associated with the electronic private prescription softwares.

== Germany ==
The „Privatrezept“ is the German equivalent to the private prescription in the United Kingdom. There are two different cases:

1. For a medical prescription which is not supplied under the „Gesetzliche Krankenversicherung“ (GKV).
2. For any medical prescription if the patient has a private medical insurance, aka. „Private Krankenversicherung“ (PKV).
