= Government off-the-shelf =

Government software

Government off-the-shelf (GOTS) is a term for software and hardware government products that are ready to use and which were created and are owned by a government agency.

Typically GOTS products are developed by the technical staff of the government agency for which it is created. It is sometimes developed by an external entity but with funding and specification from the agency. Because agencies can directly control all aspects of GOTS products, these are sometimes preferred for government purposes.

GOTS software solutions can normally be shared among government agencies without additional cost. GOTS hardware solutions are typically provided at cost (i.e., R&D costs are not recouped).

The government pays for all the development and maintenance costs of GOTS products. GOTS products run the risk of becoming obsolescent when the government cannot afford those costs. Since GOTS products are created by the government for government use, this limits the number of users, which is another factor that can lead to obsolescence.

== See also ==
- Non-developmental item (NDI)
- Commercial off-the-shelf (COTS)
- Free and open-source software (FOSS)
