= Product Licence Number =

Identifier on the packaging of medicines

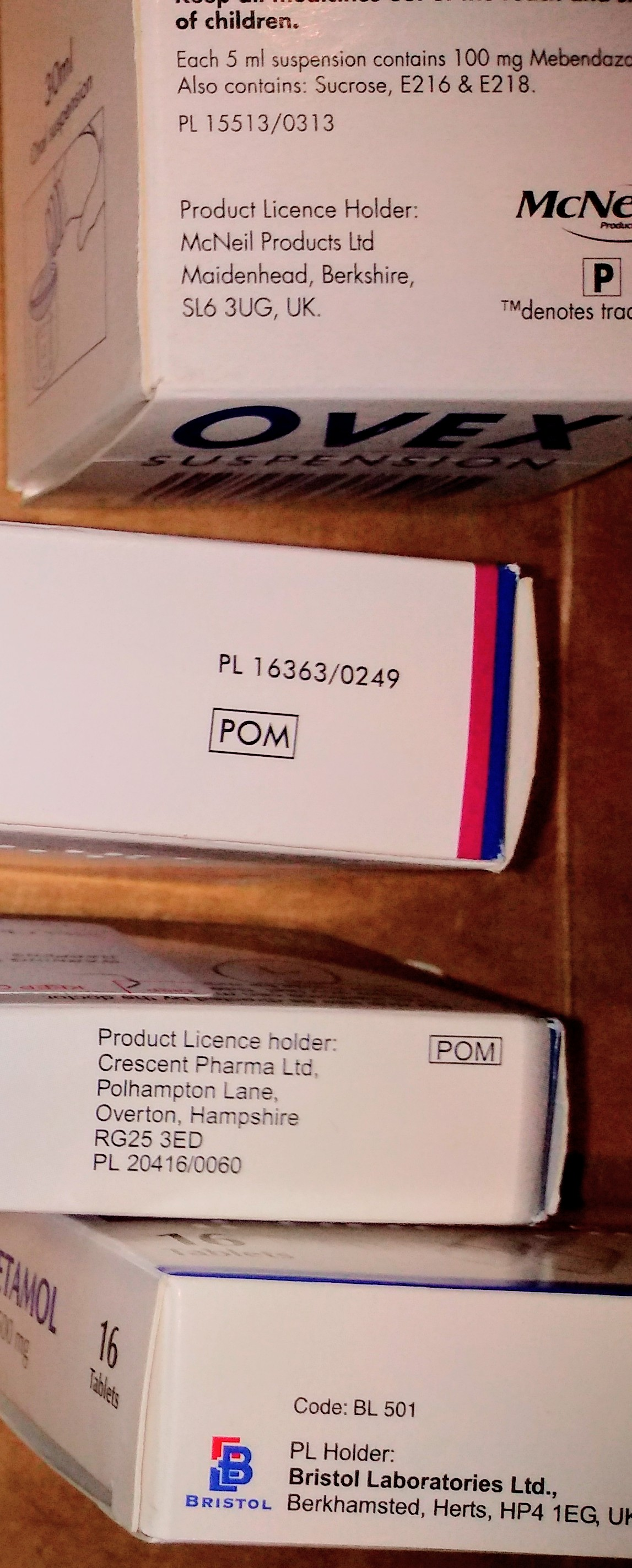
- Acronym: PL code
- Organization: Medicines and Healthcare products Regulatory Agency * European Medicines Agency
- Example: PL 34985/0004
- Website: products.mhra.gov.uk

A Product Licence Number (or PL code for short) is a unique identifier on the packaging of medicines, used to uniquely identify the product. This code will normally remain the same despite the varying marketing and branding of the companies selling it, this means for example two sets of packaging that look different (say a "big brand" and a shops "own brand") can be easily identified as actually being exactly the same product inside.

The code itself is issued by the Medicines and Healthcare products Regulatory Agency in the UK and the European Medicines Agency.
