= List of open-source health software =

The following is a list of notable software packages and applications licensed under an open-source license or in the public domain for use in the health care industry.

== Public health and biosurveillance ==
- Epi Info is public domain statistical software for epidemiology developed by Centers for Disease Control and Prevention.
- OpenELIS Global is an open-source laboratory information system for clinical and public-health laboratories
- Spatiotemporal Epidemiological Modeler is a tool, originally developed at IBM Research, for modelings and visualizing the spread of infectious diseases. It is maintained by the Eclipse Foundation and available under terms of the Eclipse Public License.

== Electronic records and medical practice management ==
Name	Maintainer	License	Programming language/ Software stack	Operating system	Features				Target setting
Name	Maintainer	License	Programming language/ Software stack	Operating system	EHR/EMR	HIS?	Practice management?	Other	Target setting
ClearHealth	ClearHealth Inc.	GNU GPL	PHP, JavaScript	?	EMR	?	Scheduling & billing	HIPAA security	
ERPNext	Frappe Technologies	GNU GPL	Python; JavaScript	?	EMR	Yes	Yes		
GaiaEHR	?	GNU GPL	PHP & Ext JS	?	EHR	?	?		
GNUmed	GNUmed	GNU GPL	Python (wxPython); PostgreSQL	Cross-platform	Yes	No	?		
GNU Health	GNU Health (GNU Project)	GNU GPL	Python; PostgreSQL	Cross-platform	EMR	Yes	Yes		
Hospital OS	?	GNU GPL	Java	Linux & Windows	?	Yes	?		Small Thai hospitals
HOSxP	?	Public domain	Delphi/Kylix	Windows	EHR	Yes	Financial		Thai hospitals
MedinTux	MedinTux team	CeCILL	C++	Cross-platform	?	?	Yes	Modular design; web & desktop interfaces	French hospital emergency departments & smaller practices
OpenEMR	?	GNU GPL	PHP, JavaScript; MySQL	Cross-platform	Yes	?	Yes	Patient portal & prescriptions	
OpenMRS	OpenMRS Inc.	MPL with Healthcare Disclaimer	Java, JavaScript	Cross-platform	EMR	?	?	Extensible & scalable	Clinic, Hospital System, Country Level Health System
OSCAR McMaster	?	GNU GPL	Java	?	EMR	?	Billing	Web interface; PHR	Canadian healthcare providers
THIRRA	?	MPL	PHP5 (CodeIgniter), JavaScript (jQuery); PostgreSQL	?	EHR	?	?	Disease surveillance; web interface	Ambulatory care & public health
VistA	US Department of Veterans Affairs	Free	MUMPS	?	EHR	?	?		Veterans Health Administration facilities
ZEPRS Zcore	Research Triangle Institute	Apache	Java	?	Yes	?	?	Web interface	

== Health system management ==
- iHRIS is an integrated Human Resource Information System developed by IntraHealth International under USAID-funded CapacityPlus project and deployed in more than 20 countries in the world. iHRIS is distributed under the GNU GPL.
- DHIS is a district health management information system and data warehouse. DHIS2 is released under the BSD license.
- HRHIS is a human resource for health information system for management of human resources for health developed by University of Dar es Salaam college of information and communication technology, Department of Computer Science and Engineering, for Ministry of Health and Social Welfare (Tanzania) and funded by the Japan International Cooperation Agency (JICA).

== Disease management ==
- Breathing Games is a series of research-backed, co-created games to prevent, diagnose and treat chronic respiratory diseases. They are released under the Peer Production licence.
- Nightscout is a collection of software tools, including mobile clients, to enable DIY cloud-based continuous glucose monitoring "...for informational and educational purposes." Individual components are available under various open-source licenses, including the GNU GPL, GNU AGPL, MIT License, and BSD licenses.
- Tidepool makes open-source tools to help people better manage diabetes. They have received FDA clearance for their Loop insulin dosing app.

== Imaging/visualization ==
- CamBA is a collection of neuroimaging pipelines distributed under the GNU GPL.
- Drishti is a volumetric visualization package for viewing computer tomography data. Able to import DICOM image stacks. It is available under the MIT license.
- Endrov Image and data viewer and editor. It is available under the BSD license.
- GIMIAS is a workflow-oriented environment focused on biomedical image computing and simulation. It is available under a BSD-style license.
- Ginkgo CADx Cross-platform open source DICOM viewer and dicomizer. It is available under the GNU LGPL.
- Insight Segmentation and Registration Toolkit (ITK) v4.0+ is released under the Apache license.
- InVesalius 3D medical imaging reconstruction software. It is available under the GNU GPL.
- ITK-SNAP Interactive software for 3D image navigation, annotation, and automatic segmentation. It is available under the GNU GPL.
- Orthanc – Lightweight, RESTful DICOM server for medical imaging. It is available under the GNU GPLv3.
- ParaView large-scale visualization tool. It is available under the BSD license.
- 3DSlicer Platform for medical image visualization and algorithm development. DICOM support, segmentation and registration, Diffusion MRI processing, and image guided surgery support. It is available under a BSD-style license.
- Voreen volume rendering engine—a library for visually exploring volume data sets. DICOM is supported and Voreen is used in medical visualization as well as for visualizing electron microscopy data. It is available under the GNU GPL.
- VTK is a visualization toolkit available under the BSD license.
- Studierfenster (StudierFenster) is a free, non-commercial Open Science client/server-based Medical Imaging Processing (MIP) online framework.
- Medical open network for AI is a framework for Deep learning in healthcare imaging that is open-source available under the Apache Licence and supported by the community.
- Weasis is cross-platform open source DICOM viewer and dicomizer. It is available under a EPL-2.0 or Apache 2.0 license.

== Medical information systems ==
- Caisis is a web-based information system for the storage and analysis of cancer patient data intended to bridge the gap between clinic and research. It is available under the GNU GPL.
- cTAKES ("clinical Text Analysis Knowledge Extraction Software") is a natural language processing system for extracting information from electronic medical record clinical free-text, an Apache top level project (TLP) since 2013, developed by the Mayo Clinic and others. It is available under the Apache license.

== Research ==
- Galaxy is a web platform for data-intensive biology using geographically distributed supercomputers.
- LabKey Server is an extensible platform for integrating, analyzing and sharing all types of biomedical research data. It provides secure, web-based access to research data and includes a customizable data processing pipeline. It is distributed under the Apache license.

== Mobile devices ==
- OpenAPS is a set of development tools and documentation to support a DIY implementation of an artificial pancreas for people with Type 1 Diabetes. Common setups include the interfacing of CGMs, Insulin Pumps, and Raspberry Pi devices. It is released under the MIT license, but compatible medical devices are proprietary.
- Ushahidi allows people to submit crisis information through text messaging using a mobile phone, email or web form. Displays information in map view. It is released under the GNU Affero General Public License, but some libraries use different licenses.

== Out-of-the-box distributions ==
- BioLinux
- Debian-Med is a Debian Pure Blend for use in medical and biomedical settings.

== Interoperability ==
- Mirth was an open source cross-platform HL7 interface engine that enabled bi-directional sending of HL7 messages between systems and applications over multiple transports. It was previously available under the Mozilla Public License. The software transitioned to a commercial license in March, 2025.

== Specifications ==
- Continuity of Care Document
- Fast Healthcare Interoperability Resources (FHIR) is a Health Level 7 interoperability specification that defines JSON and XML data formats and a RESTful API. It is available under the CC0 license.
- openEHR is an open standard specification in health informatics that describes the management and storage, retrieval and exchange of health data in electronic health records (EHRs) following a two-level modeling paradigm. The OpenEHR base specification is available under the Creative Commons Attribution-ShareAlike 3.0 Unported license.

== See also ==
- Electronic medical record
- eHealth
- Gello Expression Language
- Health informatics
- Hospital information systems
- List of freeware health software
- List of biomedical cybernetics software
- List of open-source bioinformatics software
- List of open-source health hardware
- Medical software
- mHealth
