= IMIS =

IMIS may refer to:

- Irish Military Intelligence Service
- Institute for the Management of Information Systems
- International Moving Image Society, British non-profit organisation for the moving image industries
- openIMIS, software for health financing/administration
