= SafeYOU =

Mobile application and online platform

SafeYOU is a mobile application and online platform designed to prevent and respond to gender-based violence (GBV). Developed in Armenia by the social enterprise Impact Innovations Institute (IMIN), SafeYOU provides women and girls with emergency alerts, support networks, and connections to legal and psychosocial services. The platform is free for users and incorporates AI-powered analytics to help authorities and NGOs monitor cases and inform policy.

Safe YOU has been recognized by international organizations. It is listed as an official Digital Public Good by UNICEF and the Digital Public Goods Alliance and in 2023 it won a World Summit Award (Inclusion & Empowerment) for the app’s innovation. Its founder, Mariam Torosyan, was named a Cartier Women’s Initiative Fellow and placed among the top 3 impact entrepreneurs in Europe for the 2023 Fellowship and later the Impact Award. The app has been featured in UNDP and UNFPA reports, highlighting its use of technology to save lives.

As of 2025, SafeYOU operates in multiple countries. It began with deployment in Georgia and Armenia during the COVID-19 pandemic, expanded into Iraq (Kurdistan) with UNFPA support, and later launched EU pilots in Romania and Poland.

The app is available on Android and iOS, with an emphasis on privacy and accessibility for vulnerable users.

== History ==
SafeYOU originated as a social entrepreneurship project by Mariam Torosyan, a human-rights lawyer in Armenia. Inspired by gender-based violence issues observed during a 2018 World Bank research project, Torosyan and an all-women team established Impact Innovations Institute (IMIN) in 2020 and developed the Safe YOU app as IMIN’s first product.

The formal project began in 2019 and the app was launched later that year. SafeYOU was initially intended for use in Armenia; however, the 2020 Nagorno-Karabakh war delayed the Armenian rollout. Instead, the team first launched the app in neighboring Georgia with the help of the women’s rights NGO Union Sapari. By late 2020, over 20,000 Georgians were using SafeYOU. The app later became available in Armenia as well.

Within months of its launch, Safe YOU’s emergency SOS function had already demonstrated life-saving impact. For example, a 2021 report describes a Georgian user who was able to alert police via the app and record an audio of her attacker, evidence that led to a conviction. By 2022, UNDP reported the app had “more than 25,000 users” across three countries (Armenia, Georgia, Iraq) and 60,000 women had access to its platform. A 2022 UN annual report similarly notes 60,000 women using Safe YOU in Armenia, Georgia and Iraq. The platform continued to evolve with local partnerships (e.g. with the KRG Ministry of Interior and UNFPA in Iraq) and the addition of new languages and services.

== Recognition ==
SafeYOU has received numerous awards and endorsements for its social impact:

Awards & Recognitions
Year	Award / Recognition	Issuer / Notes
2021	Digital Public Good	Officially designated by UNICEF/DPG Alliance for open-source GBV app
2022	Joint Innovation Challenge - Winner	UNFPA, one of 10 global winners
2022	Boost Women Innovators - Winner	UNDP-led accelerator (Europe/Central Asia)
2023	World Summit Award (Inclusion)	Global UN-backed WSA contest (EU Young Innovators category)
2023	Cartier Women’s Initiative - Finalist	Top-3 regional finalist (Europe Social Impact)
2025	Cartier Women’s Initiative - Impact Awardee	Cartier (2025 Impact Awards, former fellows)
