= Platform for Real-time Impact and Situation Monitoring =

Open source climate risk monitoring software

Platform for Real-time Impact and Situation Monitoring (PRISM)
- Release: 2016
- Written in: TypeScript, Python
- Type: Open Source Software
- License: MIT License
- Website: https://innovation.wfp.org/project/prism
- Repository: https://github.com/WFP-VAM/prism-app

The Platform for Real-time Impact and Situation Monitoring (PRISM) is an open source climate risk monitoring platform managed by the World Food Programme (WFP). It has an interactive map interface which integrates geospatial data on climate-related hazards with socioeconomic vulnerability data.

The software is recognized as a Digital Public Good (DPG) by the Digital Public Goods Alliance.

== History ==
PRISM was first launched in Indonesia under the name VAMPIRE (Vulnerability Analysis Monitoring Platform for Impact of Regional Events) during the 2015-2016 El Niño storm cycle, which devastated agriculture production after unexpected prolonged drought. This project was the result of a collaboration between WFP and Pulse Lab Jakarta (PLJ), a joint initiative between the United Nations and the Government of Indonesia. The tool used data science to combine datasets on Indonesia's national socio-economic survey, WFP's household food security surveys, rainfall anomalies, and the Indonesian Vegetation Health Index into a visualized interface to automate analysis. Sri Lanka's government requested that a platform like VAMPIRE be developed for its Disaster Management Ministry to deal with drought and floods.

In 2020, PRISM went through a significant technology overhaul that updated its warning systems for crisis management and disaster risk reduction. As of 2025, PRISM is actively used by the governments of Cambodia, Indonesia, Sri Lanka, and Mongolia to measure drought and abnormal weather impact on vulnerable populations.

== Implementations ==
PRISM has been used by a number of different countries and governments:

- Indonesia – An early version of PRISM was launched in Indonesia in 2016 using the name VAMPIRE. It is used today by the government to reduce disaster risk from climate-related events.
- Sri Lanka – In 2017, Sri Lanka used the VAMPIRE codebase to build the current version of PRISM. Sri Lanka's Department of Meteorology enabled real-time monitoring of climate information through PRISM. In 2022, WFP approved $7 million for Sri Lanka food security initiatives, including the ability to adapt to changing weather patterns.
- Cambodia – Since 2017, Cambodia's national community-based poverty identification system, IDPoor, has been integrated with PRISM to link socioeconomic data with geospatial data to map climate-related vulnerabilities. PRISM was used in 2020 to leverage satellite data to localize assistance to flood-affected areas
- Mongolia – In 2020, Mongolia's National Agency for Meteorology and Environmental Monitoring (NAMEM) integrated PRISM with the Mongolia Data Cube as part of the SIBELIUs project, a UK-funded initiative to improve weather-related insights for Mongolian farmers to help prevent and reduce dzud.

There are also a number of deployments that are in development across Africa and Latin America. In March 2025, Mozambique launched a deployment of PRISM through its National Meteorological Institute (INAM) to better measure abnormal weather in real-time. Deployments of PRISM in Afghanistan were planned, but paused due to the political crisis in 2021. Further deployments are in discussion in Myanmar, Zimbabwe, and several other countries in Asia and Africa.

== Technology ==
PRISM uses data from Earth Observation tools, including satellites and ground sensors. It layers weather, climate, and agricultural data such as vegetation health, rainfall, and temperature, on top of socioeconomic data for each country it is deployed in to provide near real-time data visualization on especially vulnerable populations. PRISM is able to show current conditions as well as anomalies for expected weather for a given time of year. As an open source software project, PRISM has shared configuration files that any deployment can access and customize.
