= Drishti =

Drishti and similar may refer to:

- Drishti (film), a 1990 Hindi film by Govind Nihalani
- Drishti (yoga), a part of yoga practice
- Drishti (client), a visualization tool for tomography and electron-microscopy data
- View (Buddhism) or Drishti, a concept in Buddhism
- Drisht or Drishti in definite Albanian form, a village in Albania

== See also ==
- Drishyam (disambiguation)
