= OpenIMIS =

openIMIS
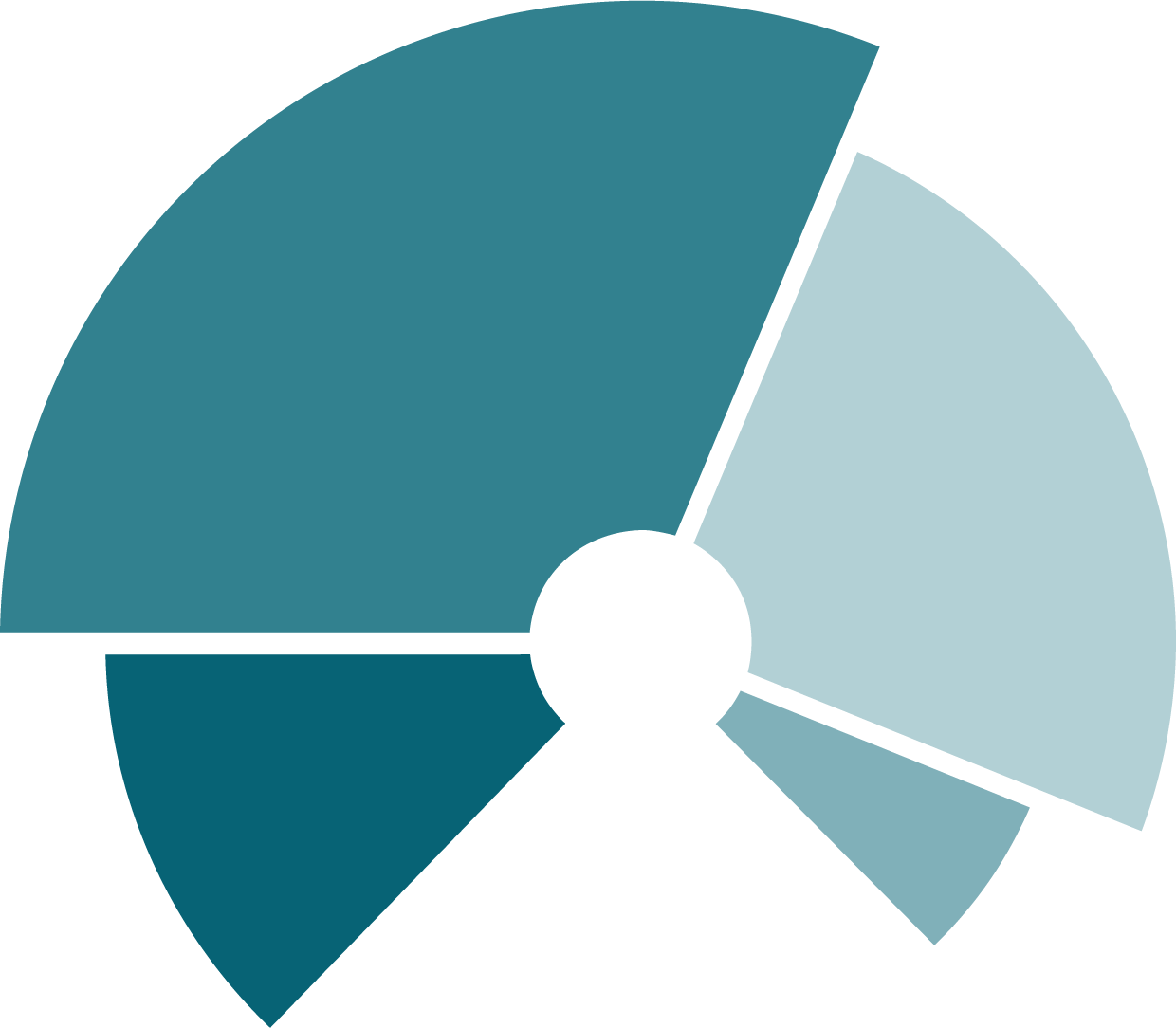
- Developer: The openIMIS Initiative
- Release: March 16, 2018
- Stable release: Release 2026-04 / October 2026
- Written in: Python/Django, JavaScript/ReactJS, PL/pgSQL, other
- Type: Health management information system
- License: GNU AGPL v3
- Website: https://openimis.org

openIMIS is an open source software which supports the administration of health financing and social protection schemes such as unconditional cash transfers and health insurances. It is jointly funded by the Swiss Agency for Development and Cooperation (SDC) and the German Federal Ministry for Economic Cooperation and Development. openIMIS provides tools to set up schemes and insurance plans for reimbursement of health care providers like hospitals, physicians and pharmacies. Social protection programmes can use openIMIS to manage the distribution of financial of in-kind benefits to specific target groups, especially poverty population.

The openIMIS initiative is a group of partners who support and expand the global reach of openIMIS^{1}. It supports the development of Universal Health Coverage (UHC) and Universal Social Protection (USP) for the poor. openIMIS contributes to achieving the Sustainable Development Goals (SDGs): especially SDG 1:"End poverty in all its forms everywhere"^{2}, and more specifically 1.3 "Implement nationally appropriate social protection systems and measures for all, including floors, and by 2030 achieve substantial coverage of the poor and the vulnerable" and [SDG 3], target 3.8 "Achieve universal health coverage, including financial risk protection, access to quality essential health-care services and access to safe, effective, quality and affordable essential medicines and vaccines for all".

The Sector Programme Social Protection of the Deutsche Gesellschaft für Internationale Zusammenarbeit (GIZ) works for the German Development Cooperation (GDC) under the commission of the Federal Ministry for Economic Cooperation and Development (BMZ). It manages the community around openIMIS. openIMIS is officially recognized as a Digital Public Good.

== History ==
IMIS as it was called at the time was originally developed to manage the Community Health Funds (CHF) in Tanzania in 2012, with financial support from the Swiss Agency for Development and Cooperation (SDC) and technical expertise from the Swiss Tropical and Public Health Institute (Swiss TPH), the Micro Insurance Academy (MIA), and Exact Software. By 2013, it was rapidly adopted in other schemes in Cameroon and Nepal.

IMIS was licensed by SDC as an open source software under the GNU's Affero General Public License v3 (AGPL v3). In collaboration with the German Development Cooperation, the openIMIS initiative was launched in 2016 as the first open source software to support the management of social (health) protection schemes by linking beneficiary, provider and payer data^{5}. As of 2022, the master version of openIMIS is being used in 5 countries : Tanzania, Cameroon, Niger, Mauritania, and Nepal with pilot programmes in the Democratic Republic of Congo and Chad.

== Further development ==
The versions of openIMIS used in Tanzania, Nepal and Cameroon had different features. In order to unite these features a master version for openIMIS was created in 2017^{5}. Although openIMIS is licensed under the GNU AGPL, it still uses proprietary technology like Microsoft SQL server. In 2018 three tenders were released by GIZ for this goal: for software maintenance, release management and 3rd level support, for capacity building and promotion and for modular transformation.

== Deployments ==
The first deployment of openIMIS (IMIS at the time) was in Tanzania when it was used to manage the Community Health Funds Programme in 2012. It was later customised and used in Cameroon by the Bamenda Ecclesiastical Provincial Health Assistance to manage its insurance schemes in different dioceses. The government of Nepal also launched a social health insurance scheme in 2014 and IMIS was customised to manage the scheme. In 2020, the government of Zanzibar reviewed its health financing policy and with the help of PharmAccess, openIMIS was used to support the enrollment process and to process utilisation data^{5}.

== Community ==
The openIMIS initiative is made up of a community of developers, implementers, partners and users. In March 2021, the openIMIS initiative expanded its reach to French-speaking Africa and the Toumai Community was created.

How the community is supporting new implementations:

The Catalytic implementation Fund (CIF)^{3} was introduced by BMZ and SDC managed by the coordination desk of the openIMIS initiative which is found at the GIZ office in Bonn Germany. The CIF provides support like technical and financial assistance to potential scheme operators ^{5} for new implementations.

== See also ==
- DHIS
- GNU Health
- List of open-source health software
