= Practice management software =

Practice management software may refer to software used for the management of a professional office:

- Law practice management software
- Medical practice management software
- Veterinary practice management software

There are also practice management software programs for accounting, architecture, veterinary, dental, optometry and other practices.
