= Orthanc (server) =

DICOM server

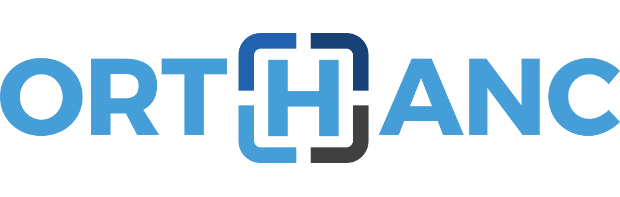
- Original authors: Sébastien Jodogne, Liège University Hospital, Osimis, Orthanc Team, Université catholique de Louvain
- Release: 19 July 2012; 14 years ago
- Stable release: 1.13.1 / 17 November 2026; 0 days ago
- Written in: C++, HTML, JavaScript
- Operating system: Linux, Windows, macOS
- Available in: English
- Type: Vendor Neutral Archive
- License: GPLv3
- Website: www.orthanc-server.com
- Repository: hg.orthanc-server.com/orthanc/

Orthanc is a standalone DICOM software server. It is designed to improve the DICOM flows in hospitals and to support research about the automated analysis of medical images. Orthanc lets its users focus on the content of the DICOM files, hiding the complexity of the DICOM format and of the DICOM protocol. It is licensed under the GPLv3.

Orthanc can turn any computer running Windows, Linux or macOS into a DICOM store (in other words, a mini-PACS system). Its architecture is standalone, meaning that no complex database administration is required, nor the installation of third-party dependencies. Orthanc is also available as Docker images.

Orthanc provides a RESTful API on top of a DICOM server. Therefore, it is possible to drive Orthanc from any computer language. The DICOM tags of the stored medical images can be downloaded in the JSON file format. Furthermore, standard PNG images can be generated on the fly from the DICOM instances by Orthanc.

== Plugins ==
Orthanc also features a plugin mechanism to add new modules that extends the core capabilities of its REST API. As of May 2022, a dozen of plugins are available:

- multiple DICOM Web viewers,
- a PostgreSQL database back-end,
- a MySQL database back-end,
- an ODBC database back-end,
- a reference implementation of DICOMweb,
- a Whole Slide Imaging viewer and tools to convert to/from WSI formats.
- 3 Object storage storage back-end,
- a Python (programming language) plugin
- a plugin to access data from The Cancer Imaging Archive
- a plugin to index a local storage
- a plugin to handle Neuroimaging file formats

== History and awards ==
Orthanc was initiated by Sébastien Jodogne in 2011 as a postdoctoral researcher at CHU de Liège. The initial public release happened on 19 July 2012; 14 years ago.

For his work on Orthanc, Sébastien Jodogne received the 2014 Advancement of Free Software award. Orthanc also received the Agoria award for the best 2015 e-health project in Belgium.

Between 2017 and 2021, the development has been supported by the Osimis company, still with Sébastien Jodogne as the lead developer. Since 2021, the development has been handled both by Alain Mazy with financial support from Open Collective, and by the health informatics research team led by Sébastien Jodogne at Université Catholique de Louvain.

Orthanc was recognized as a digital public good by the Digital Public Goods Alliance in August 2023.

== Distribution ==
Orthanc is part of the Debian Med project. Official packages are available for numerous Linux distributions including Debian, Ubuntu and Fedora. Ports are available for FreeBSD and OpenBSD. Windows/MacOS binary installer packages may be freely downloaded from the Orthanc website but are provided by a commercial partner.

Orthanc is also available as a Beta-package through the package center for Synology NAS users.

== See also ==
- Picture Archiving and Communication System
- List of open-source health software
