= Fastra II =

Desktop supercomputer for tomography

- An overview image of the Fastra II, showing all seven video cards in action
- Active: operational from late 2009
- Architecture: Intel Core i7 920 quad-core processors, Asus P6T7 WS Supercomputer Motherboard, 6 dual-GPU GeForce GTX 295, one single-GPU GeForce GTX 275
- Power: Thermaltake: 1 Toughpower 1500 W, 3 PowerExpress 450 W each
- Operating system: CentOS 5.3
- Memory: 24 GB
- Storage: 1 TB
- Speed: 12 TFLOPS
- Cost: € 6,000
- Purpose: Tomography
- Website: http://fastra.ua.ac.be/

The Fastra II is a desktop supercomputer designed for tomography. It was built in late 2009 by the ASTRA (All Scale Tomographic Reconstruction Antwerp) group of researchers of the IBBT (Interdisciplinary institute for BroadBand Technology) VisionLab at the University of Antwerp and by Belgian computer shop Tones, in collaboration with Asus, a Taiwanese multinational computer product manufacturer, as the successor to the Fastra I (built in 2008).

The Fastra II was determined to be over three times faster than the Fastra I, which in turn was slightly faster than a 512-core cluster. However, because of the number of GPUs in the computer, the system initially suffered from several issues, including the system refusing to reboot and overheating due to a lack of space between the video cards.

== Development ==
The computer was built as a researching and demonstration project by the ASTRA group of researchers at the Vision Lab in the University of Antwerp in Belgium, one of the researchers being Joost Batenburg. Unlike other modern supercomputers such as the Cray Jaguar and the IBM Roadrunner, which cost millions of euros, the Fastra II only uses consumer hardware, costing €6,000 in total.

The Fastra II's predecessor, the Fastra I, has 4 dual-GPU GeForce 9800 GX2 video cards, for a total of 8 GPUs. At that time, the ASTRA group needed a motherboard that had four PCI Express x16 slots with double-spacing between each of them. The only such motherboard the ASTRA group could find at that time was the MSI K9A2 Platinum, which has four such slots. In 2009, the Asus P6T7 WS Supercomputer motherboard, which the Fastra II uses, was released, which has seven PCI Express x16 slots. The Fastra II has six faster dual-GPU GeForce GTX 295 video cards, and a single-GPU GeForce GTX 275, for a total of 13 GPUs. In the Fastra II, the GPUs mainly perform tomographic reconstruction. The technique which allows GPUs to perform general-purpose tasks like this outside of gaming, instead of CPUs, is called GPGPU, general-purpose computing on graphics processing units.

=== Challenges ===
Overheating caused by the lack of space between the video cards forces researchers using the FASTRA II to keep the side panel door open, so that the video cards can get regular air, decreasing the overall temperature inside the case.

Due to the number of GPUs in the system, its initial boot was unsuccessful. This was because its motherboard normally uses a 32 bit BIOS, which only had approximately 3 GB of address space for the video cards. However, Asus managed to provide them a specialized BIOS that entirely skipped the address space allocation of the GTX 295 video cards. The BIOS-replacement coreboot was not tested.

All seven PCI Express x16 slots in the Asus P6T7 motherboard were used in the building of the Fastra II computer. However, the video cards in the Fastra II are wide enough to require two such slots each. To solve this issue, the researchers came up with flexible PCI Express cables, and Tones developed a custom cage which allowed the video cards to suspend over the motherboard.

== Specifications and benchmarks ==
Like the Fastra I, the Fastra II uses a Lian Li PC-P80 Armorsuit case, which has 10 expansion slots. The motherboard in the Fastra II was at that time the only workstation motherboard that had seven full-sized PCI Express x16 slots. The memory modules were initially six 2 GB modules, but were later upgraded to 4 GB each, for a total of 24 GB. Instead of an eighth dual-GPU video card, the single-GPU GTX 275 is in the computer because, out of all the video cards in the Fastra II, the GTX 275 is the only one the Fastra II's BIOS can fully initialize. The total amount of GPUs is 13. The video cards together bring 12 teraflops of computing power. Four of the six GTX 295 video cards have 2 PCBs, while the other two have only 1 PCB.

According to the benchmarks on its official website, the Fastra II is faster and more power efficient than its competitors, including the Fastra I and the Tesla C1060 video card. The benchmarks were performed on the Fastra II, the Fastra I, a 512-core cluster (consisting of Opteron CPUs), an Nvidia Tesla C1060 workstation card on an Intel Core i7 940 CPU, and on an Intel Core i7 940 CPU itself. The Fastra II is over three times faster than the Fastra I in CT slice reconstruction speed. Although the Fastra II consumes more power than the Fastra I, it's nearly 3 times as energy efficient as the Fastra I, and over 300 times as energy efficient as the 512-core cluster. The video cards run at 37 degrees Celsius when idle, and at 60 degrees Celsius at full load.

Image showing the differences between the Fastra I and the Fastra II in spatial resolution that is required to analyze changes of bone parameters

== Applications and reception ==
The operating system is CentOS, a community driven Linux distribution and Red Hat Enterprise Linux clone.

The Fastra II received a positive public impression. Techie.com called it the "world's most powerful desktop-sized supercomputer", describing it as a computer with "so much power in such a small space." iTech News Net called it "the Most Powerful Desktop Supercomputer".

Fastra II relies on Nvidia's Scalable Link Interface (SLI) and is therefore limited to the number of GPUs supported by it, the vendor, and the free and open-source device drivers. The Fastra II's motherboard is designed for workstations, and the computer is mainly being used in hospitals for medical imaging.

It remains to be seen whether another Fastra, featuring NVLink, first available with Pascal-based GPUs, will be built.

== See also ==
- Direct Rendering Infrastructure#GPGPU
- Debian-Med
- Beowulf cluster
- coreboot
