= Torkel Opsahl Academic EPublisher =

Academic publisher

The Torkel Opsahl Academic EPublisher (TOAEP) is an academic publisher specializing in international law and policy. Established in 2010, it is named after the late European international lawyer Torkel Opsahl (1931-1993). TOAEP originally grew out of the Peace Research Institute Oslo (PRIO) as a research project. It is owned by the Centre for International Law Research and Policy (CILRAP), an independent international research centre incorporated in Brussels, Belgium, but it has editorial independence. TOAEP also works out of the CILRAP Bottega in Florence, Italy.

TOAEP was the first academic e-publisher in international law, publishing both in print and freely online, and the first publisher to be certified by the Digital Public Goods Alliance, along with its full catalogue. It has five publication series in international criminal and humanitarian law, and other areas of international law, which are all available online and may be downloaded free of charge.

TOAEP's Editor-in-Chief is Morten Bergsmo.
