= ZEPRS =

The Zambia Electronic Perinatal Record System (ZEPRS) is an Electronic Medical Record (EMR) system used by public obstetric clinics and a hospital (the University Teaching Hospital) in Lusaka, Zambia.

== Background ==
In early 2001 a team of physicians at the University of Alabama at Birmingham (UAB) and visiting Zambian physician Dr. Moses Sinkala conceived the idea based on a successful electronic perinatal record system that the UAB had developed and proven in clinics in Birmingham. In July 2001, the Bill & Melinda Gates Foundation awarded a grant to the UAB to develop a similar system to serve public obstetric clinics in Lusaka, Zambia.

The UAB team solicited proposals for the technical design and implementation of the system from several private sector information technology firms, including Electronic Data Systems, before awarding a contract to RTI International (RTI), a large 501(c)3 not-for-profit research organization based in Research Triangle Park, North Carolina. Other project partners included the Center for Infectious Disease Research in Zambia (CIDRZ), and the Lusaka District Health Management Team of the Zambian Central Board of Health.

== Objectives ==
ZEPRS was designed to improve maternal and perinatal outcomes by:

1. Improving perinatal care for women and postnatal care for neonates by:
  1. Promoting adherence to good standard of care practices
  2. Identifying and document potential medical/ obstetrical problems so that effective therapies can be administered
  3. Improving communication and referrals among providers
  4. Enhancing monitoring and evaluation of outcomes, clinics, and providers
2. Improving efficiency, completeness, accuracy of documentation and reporting

== Major components ==
ZEPRS achieves these objectives by providing the following:

- An electronic patient record system with patient record database shared among facilities
- A system that guides clinicians through the Zambian standard of care
- Intelligent rules that alert clinicians to problems and recommend patient referral when appropriate
- Standard & ad hoc reporting for supportive supervision, surveillance, and analysis
- An electronic-first system used by clinicians during the course of patient care
- An electronic referral system to improve the efficiency and effectiveness of referrals

ZEPRS components include a voice and data wireless network that interconnects facilities; wired and wireless networks within facilities; a data center managed by CIDRZ; and an electronic perinatal record system with integrated patient referral system.

ZEPRS uses a tabbed user interface and role-based access control system to enable several clinicians to share the same computer to retrieve and enter data for different patients.

== Software architecture ==
ZEPRS has been developed using the Java programming language. Other technologies used include AJAX, Quartz, MySQL, and others. ZEPRS has its own content management system called DynaSite, that makes it easy to add forms, fields, form flows, and business rules without programming. RTI has developed a locally installable version of the software using the Eclipse Rich Client Platform (RCP) and the Apache Derby embedded database. This version uses the free and open source Zcore platform, which uses an implementation of RSS to transmit data over intermittent networks, such as mobile phone networks.

== Development history ==
RTI worked with South African firm Communications Solutions (Comsol) to conduct a wireless site survey of all facilities, and to design a line-of-sight wireless network to connect them. By March 2003 this network was operational. Before the end of 2003 RTI had worked with Comsol to add Voice over Internet Protocol (VoIP) to provide voice communication between facilities, and had extended the network to connect multiple buildings in clinic compounds and to multiple wards of the University Teaching Hospital.

Three to nine networked PCs and one laser printer were installed in each clinic, as well as additional PCs and printers in the University Teaching Hospital and administrative offices. The ZEPRS data center was installed at CIDRZ, which housed the combined ZEPRS technical support team.

Approximately 800 clinicians, many of whom had never used a computer, were trained in basic computer literacy. Standard clinical protocol reference works and email were made available to clinicians electronically over the ZEPRS network.

By early May 2004 RTI had completed an open source electronic patient referral system. This was launched into production use in clinics on 22 June 2004. Clinicians adopted this component readily and the system was soon rolled out to all 24 clinics and the University Teaching Hospital.

Also in May 2004, CIDRZ asked RTI whether the ZEPRS software could be adapted to help in managing antiretroviral therapy (ART) to treat patients infected with the Human immunodeficiency virus (HIV). Version 1.0 of this software, the ART Patient Tracking System (ART/PTS), was launched into use at Kalingalinga Clinic on 1 June 2004.

RTI reviewed the completed Beta version of the fully integrated perinatal record system with the UAB team in July 2005, and released Version 1.0 on 21 November 2005. This version was pilot tested in a limited number of clinics in Lusaka from December 2005 through January 2006. ZEPRS was launched into production use in two clinics in February 2006. The system was rolled out to all clinics at the average rate of one clinic each month until the roll out was completed in August 2007.

== Current status ==
Since roll out was completed in August 2007, ZEPRS has been used by 24 public obstetrics clinics, as well as six wards (blocks A-D, adult ARV ward, and pediatric ARV ward) within the University Teaching Hospital in Lusaka. The ZEPRS patient record database has been used since February 2006 for routine health surveillance, monitoring, and supervision of health care. A 2006 study cited the use of a ZEPRS-based patient record system as one of four key factors in the successful rapid scale-up of antiretroviral therapy at primary care sites in Zambia.

By September 2011 ZEPRS contained medical records for more than 510,000 patients and ZEPRS had been used to manage multiple pregnancies for more than 20,000 mothers. In 2011 an average of more than 8,000 new antenatal patients were being registered in the system each month and the system was being used by 278 individual users. Clinicians in 25 facilities have used ZEPRS to manage perinatal care during more than 7.7 million patient encounters with more than 770,000 patients and during more than 335,000 deliveries.

Information regarding the impact of ZEPRS on the quality of health care and health outcomes can be obtained by contacting the Center for Infectious Disease Research in Zambia or the Zambian Central Board of Health.

== Ongoing development ==
Since ZEPRS was launched in February 2006 it has been continually refined and enhanced based on input from clinicians and emerging needs. In 2008 RTI worked with CIDRZ to implement an interface with the Laboratory Information Management System (LMIS) at Kalingalinga Clinic, enabling lab test results such as CD4 counts to be transferred to patient records automatically twice daily. RTI has developed a version of the software that can be installed locally, be used within a facility in the absence of network connectivity, and can synchronize records automatically when connectivity is detected. This version is based on the free and open source Zcore platform, which can transmit data automatically over intermittent networks, such as mobile phone networks.

== Adaptability ==
The Zcore software platform that emerged from ZEPRS has been used for managing pharmaceutical supplies in health centers in Nairobi, Kenya, managing malaria indoor residual spraying operations in Kenya, and managing medical and legal care for rape survivors in South Africa.

== Availability ==
ZEPRS has been released by RTI as free and open source software under the Apache Software License (Version 2.0). RTI has released ZEPRS documentation under a Creative Commons Attribution-NonCommercial-ShareAlike 2.5 License.

== See also ==
- GNU Health – Free hospital, social medicine and laboratory informatics software
- OpenEMR – Open-source health record system
- OpenMRS – Open-source Project for Software Development
