= Drishyam (disambiguation) =

Drishyam is a 2013 Indian Malayalam-language film.

Drishyam (lit. 'view') may also refer to:

- Drishyam (film series), a Malayalam-language thriller film series by Jeethu Joseph, including the 2013 film above
  - Drishyam 2, a 2021 sequel to the 2013 film
  - Drishyam 3, a 2026 sequel to the 2021 film
- Drishyam (2015 film), a Hindi-language remake by Nishikant Kamat of the 2013 film
  - Drishyam 2 (2022 film), a remake by Abhishek Pathak of the 2021 Malayalam film and a sequel to the above.
  - Drishyam: The Conclusion, third sequel and last Hindi-language film of Abishek Pathak remake.
- Papanasam (film), working title Drishyam, a 2015 Indian Tamil-language film by Jeethu Joseph, remake of his 2013 film
- Drishyam Films, an Indian film production company

== See also ==
- Drushyam, a 2014 Telugu-language remake by Sripriya of the 2013 film
  - Drushyam 2, a 2021 remake of the 2021 Malayalam film and a sequel to the above
- Drishya, a 2014 Kannada-language remake of the 2013 film
  - Drishya 2, a 2021 remake of the 2021 Malayalam film and a sequel to the above
- Drishti (disambiguation)
