= OpenELIS Global =

OpenELIS Global is a free and open-source laboratory information system (LIS) for clinical, public health, environmental, and veterinary or vector-surveillance laboratories. It is used to run laboratory operations ranging from a single facility to national laboratory networks, and is developed and stewarded by the Digital Initiatives Group (DIGI) at the University of Washington's Department of Global Health. It has been deployed in laboratories in more than 25 countries, with national-scale implementations including Côte d'Ivoire, Haiti, Mauritius, Vietnam, and Indonesia.

== History ==
OpenELIS has early documented implementations in clinical and reference laboratories in Haiti and Côte d'Ivoire. In Côte d'Ivoire, the system has been in routine use since 2009, developed jointly with the country's Ministry of Health and the University of Washington's International Training and Education Center for Health, with funding from the President's Emergency Plan for AIDS Relief (PEPFAR); by 2021 it had been installed in more than 100 laboratories covering HIV, tuberculosis, food and drug safety, and routine testing data. The system was subsequently implemented in other countries, including Vietnam.

== Capabilities ==
OpenELIS covers the laboratory testing workflow, including patient and sample management, results entry and validation, quality control, and reporting, and consolidates clinical, environmental, and vector-surveillance testing on a single platform, an approach the project describes as "One Health". Quality-control features include reference-range enforcement, Westgard-rule monitoring with Levey–Jennings charts, and corrective-action tracking used to support ISO 15189 and SLIPTA accreditation.

== Deployments ==
In Côte d'Ivoire the system has been implemented across a national network of clinical laboratories as part of an HIV and public-health laboratory data programme. In 2020, the United Nations Development Programme (UNDP) country office in Mauritius acted as liaison to implement OpenELIS at the country's Central Health Laboratory during the COVID-19 pandemic; UNDP reported that the deployment reduced the staff required to process and report test data and avoided a substantially larger procurement cost. Implementations have also been reported in Kenya.

== Evaluation ==
A 2024 quasi-experimental study published in JMIR Public Health and Surveillance examined 21 clinical laboratories in Côte d'Ivoire and found that laboratory data timeliness and completeness improved following implementation of OpenELIS. A 2022 study examined the system's development and national-scale sustainability over its first 13 years in the country, and a 2016 study examined its implementation and host-country ownership in Vietnam.

== Technology ==
OpenELIS is web-based, with a Java/Spring backend and a React front end, and is deployed using Docker-based containerised infrastructure. It provides interoperability through the HL7 FHIR R4 standard, for which the project publishes a FHIR implementation guide, alongside ASTM and HL7 v2 interfaces for laboratory analyzers and LOINC and SNOMED terminology, and is aligned with the OpenHIE architecture for exchange with electronic medical records and health information exchanges. It is released under the Mozilla Public License 2.0. OpenELIS is recognised as a Digital Square "global good for health" and is listed as a digital public good by the Digital Public Goods Alliance.
