= Hospital OS =

Hospital management software

- License: GNU GPL
- Website: www.hospital-os.com/en/

Hospital OS is a research and development project for a hospital management software to support small hospitals. It is supported by the Thailand Research Fund and is free software released under the GNU GPL.

Hospital OS is implemented in 95 small rural hospitals and 402 health centres serving at least 5 million patients.

== See also ==
- GNU Health
- HOSxP
- List of open-source health software
