= OSCAR McMaster =

- Developer: McMaster University
- Stable release: 19 / 2023-07-11
- Operating system: Cross-platform
- Type: Medical practice management software
- License: GPL v2
- Website: worldoscar.org

OSCAR McMaster is a web-based electronic medical record (EMR) system initially developed for academic primary care clinics. It has grown into a comprehensive EMR and billing system used by many doctor's offices and private medical clinics in Canada and other parts of the world. The name is derived from where it was created and an acronym; OSCAR stands for Open Source Clinical Application and Resource and McMaster refers to McMaster University, where it was developed. It enables the delivery of evidence resources at the point of care.

Since December 1, 2005, OSCAR McMaster has received successive certifications by OntarioMD under the Physician IT Program. OSCAR McMaster version 19 has also achieved ISO 13485:2016 and ISO 27001 certifications, and has met the requirements of the latest OntarioMD Specification 4.1A. On September 30, 2012, OSCAR McMaster v12 product received Pre-implementation Certification for Jurisdiction Class, Laboratory and Clinical Documents, Electronic Medical Record. As of May 3, 2016, OSCAR is the only open-source Clinical Management System (CMS) product (out of a list of fourteen certified products from ten vendors) to meet/exceed the requirements that ensure the product supports defined standards for clinical and practice management software and is currently holding twenty percent of the market share.

== Components of OSCAR ==
OSCAR has many features which computerize and coordinate the important functions of a medical clinic.

- oscarEncounter is the patient's electronic medical record. It contains all of the patient's medical information, including CPP (Cumulative Patient Profile), patient history, progress notes, forms, documents, consultations and more.
- oscarRx is the OSCAR prescription program, which allows you to create electronic prescriptions, save personalized prescription information and favorites, and stay informed about possible drug interactions and allergy conflicts for each patient. Prescription printing on label printers is supported, as are "wet" signatures placed on electronic prescriptions using external signature pads.
- oscarBilling is an integrated billing module that supports automated billing submission and reconciliation in the provinces of ON and BC.
- oscarDocument, a system for attaching any type of file to a patient's chart.
- Consultations allow you to send and manage referrals from OSCAR.
- eForms allow you to create (and import) custom "templates" which are useful for pre-filling patient data into commonly used forms, such as requisitions. eForms can be fully customized as they are simple HTML elements on top of a background image, and they can be imported/shared.
- Report by Template: able to run custom reports on any information in the OSCAR database and import report templates
- REST API and SOAP API: OSCAR has a full API for programmatic integration with other software systems.
- Electronic Referral Network integration: Integration with OCEAN eReferral network and other features.

== Features ==
- Web-based, multiplatform
- Open-source software based on open architecture components
- Multilingual interface support
- Know2Act, a collaborative database of clinical tools, shared across trusted social network groups and usable information available at the point of care.
- First EMR to be able to seamlessly integrate across independent EMR installations
- Faxing integration - send faxes from OSCAR (e.g. consultation requests, eForms etc.) and receive incoming faxes in the inbox to file

== Technical Features ==
- OSCAR is primarily written in JavaServer Pages (JSP) and served via the Apache Tomcat servlet container. The backend storage is a MySQL database (MariaDB). Most installations are performed on an Ubuntu Linux server (commercial deployments use a containerized version).
- OSCAR is installed on a different machine than the one it is used on, in a server-client configuration.

== Support Resources ==
Being an open source project, much of the support for OSCAR is obtained from the community, through the OSCAR mailing lists. The most active mailing list is oscarmcmaster-bc-users, with advanced topics happening in oscar-advanced-users.

Commercial support is also offered by office OSCAR Service Providers, or OSPs. Certain OSPs employ full-time development staff to maintain the code and to include proprietary features for their clients so end user physician can be locked into a particular provider although the basic code is open source.

=== Support Sites ===
- The oscarcanada.org and oscarmanual.org support sites are outdated and no longer updated. The support site for current versions of OSCAR is worldoscar.org which is supported by volunteers of the OSCAR community.
