= HOSxP =

Hospital information system, Thailand

- Original author: Chaiyaporn Suratemekul
- Developer: Bangkok Medical Software Company
- Release: 1999
- Written in: Delphi
- Operating system: Microsoft Windows
- Available in: Thai
- Type: Hospital information system
- License: GNU General Public License
- Website: hosxp.net

HOSxP is a hospital information system, commonly known as an Electronic Health Record (EHR) system, used in hospitals across Thailand, serving over 300 hospitals. The software aims to ease the healthcare workflow of health centers, for small sanatoriums to central hospitals.

Before becoming HOSxP, the software was called KSK-HDBMS. Seeking a more friendly name, the development team opted for the name HOSxP, which comes from Hospital and Experience. The name also reflects the software's graphical user interface (GUI), which mimics the theme of Windows XP.

Distributed under the GNU General Public License (GPL), HOSxP is available as a free software in HOSxP-PCU (HOSxP Version for Primary Health Care Unit) and as a yearly subscription in HOSxP & HOSxP XE (HOSxP Version 4).

== History ==
The development started in 1999. Emerged from a solo project by Chaiyaporn Suratemekul, a pharmacist by training, and the main developers of the software are staffs from Bangkok Medical Software Co., Ltd., a company led by Chaiyaporn. The development infrastructure, including source code repository.

in 2012 BMS has announcement the HOSxP changed update download from Free Download to Yearly Subscription Update since HOSxP V.3.55.8.15 but no effect for HOSxP PCU.

in 2015 BMS has announcement the HOSxP XE (HOSxP v4), announcement HOSxP V.3 nearby End of Life and improve HOSxP XE PCU to Yearly Subscription Update.

== Architecture and technical information ==
HOSxP uses a client–server architecture. For the database server, it is claimed to run on many RDBMS, like MySQL, Microsoft SQL Server, PostgreSQL, and Interbase/Firebird.

It uses a two-tier Client–server architecture with server software running on either Linux or Microsoft Windows and client software can run only on Microsoft Windows. It implements Distributed Component Object Model (DCOM) and uses Multi-tier technology based on Borland DataSnap.

Borland Delphi and its Linux counterpart Kylix are the integrated development environments of choice in the project.

A user is allowed to write scripts in the Pascal programming language to automate tasks in HOSxP.

== See also ==
- List of open source healthcare software
- Hospital OS

== Related Publications ==
- Sarutiyapithorn, Napat; Wisawanart, Nutrugee; Saowaneepitak, Mutita; Kusakunniran, Worapan; Thongkanchorn, Kittikhun (July 2015). Electronic health information standard based on CDA for Thai medical system: Focused on medical procedures in medium-sized hospitals (HOSxP). 2015 12th International Joint Conference on Computer Science and Software Engineering (JCSSE). pp. 97–101. doi:10.1109/JCSSE.2015.7219778. ISBN 978-1-4799-1966-6.
- Ngamsuriyaroj, Sudsanguan; Sirichamchaikul, Chatchai; Hanam, Suparat; Tatsanaboonya, Techat (May 2011). Patient information exchange via web services in HL 7 v3 for two different healthcare systems. 2011 Eighth International Joint Conference on Computer Science and Software Engineering (JCSSE). pp. 420–425. doi:10.1109/JCSSE.2011.5930158. ISBN 978-1-4577-0686-8.
