= Digital public goods =

Digital good that is non-excludable and non-rivalrous

Digital public goods are public goods in the form of software, data sets, AI models, standards or content. They often form the basis for society-wide digital public infrastructure (DPI) such as identity systems or data exchange. Digital public goods are generally open source or free cultural works that are intended to contribute to sustainable national and international digital development.

The term "digital public good" has been in use since at least April 2017, when Nicholas Gruen wrote Building the Public Goods of the Twenty-First Century. The concept has attracted attention as new technologies are increasingly seen as having the potential to benefit society, leading to the development of evaluation frameworks for competing projects. Some countries, non-governmental organizations (NGOs), and private sector entities have identified digital technologies as a tool for achieving the Sustainable Development Goals (SDGs). This application of public goods in digital platforms has led to the use of the term "digital public goods".

Various international agencies, including UNICEF and the United Nations Development Programme (UNDP), are investigating digital public goods as a possible approach to enhancing digital inclusion, particularly for children in emerging economies. Digital public goods are used by governments around the world.

The Digital Public Goods Alliance maintains a registry of digital public goods, recognized according to a nine-part standard, and advocates for their implementation. As of October 2026 there are 255 entries.

== Definition ==
A digital public good is defined by the UN Secretary-General's Roadmap for Digital Cooperation, as: "open source software, open data, open AI models, open standards and open content that adhere to privacy and other applicable laws and best practices, do no harm, and help attain the SDGs."

Public goods are generally understood as resources that are owned or provided for public use, such as a public clean water system. Digital Public Goods, however, differ from physical public goods in that they are not constrained by scarcity or resource depletion. Because they are digital, they can be stored, copied, and distributed indefinitely without being depleted, and often at minimal cost. Some proponents of digital public goods argue that abundance, rather than scarcity, is an inherent characteristic of digital resources within the digital commons.

Digital public goods are noted to share certain traits with traditional public goods including non-rivalry and non-excludability.

== DPG References ==
This 2019 Wikimania submission discusses how the concept of a public good has evolved into that of a digital public good:

A public good is a good that is both non-excludable (no one can be prevented from consuming this good) and non-rivalrous (the consumption of this good by anyone does not reduce the quantity available to others). Extending this definition to global public goods, they become goods with benefits that extend to all countries, people, and generations and are available across national borders everywhere. Knowledge and information goods embody global public goods when provided for free (otherwise the trait of non-excludability could not be met on the basis of excluding those who cannot pay for those goods). The online world provides a great medium for the provision of global public goods, where they become global digital public goods. Once produced in their digital form, global public goods are essentially costless to replicate and make available to all, under the assumption that users have Internet connectivity to access these goods.

In a World Bank blog post, its international importance for disaster risk management is described as:

Digital public goods have the potential to transform the way disaster risk is managed while supporting innovation and collaboration globally. A global effort is needed to advance the creation and uptake of high value digital public goods for disaster risk reduction. International organizations and governments have a leading role to play in ensuring technologies and knowledge are benefiting those who need them the most, while ensuring they do no harm.

In the Linux Foundation's The European Public Sector Open Source Opportunity report, DPGs are put in a context of Digital Government:

Ireland's "Build to Share" programme exemplifies the government's commitment to the digital public goods ethos in its digital transformation of essential public services. Collaborating with three Irish SMEs, the programme focuses on creating reusable software building blocks for vital, "cradle to grave" citizen services. Tony Shannon highlighted the goal of fostering collaboration, driving efficiency, and reducing costs by sharing software across government bodies.

The Rockefeller Foundation, DPGA and the Norwegian Ministry of Foreign Affairs, authored Digital Public Infrastructure for an Equitable Recovery in 2021:

Budget, procurement, and development assistance policies need to be modernized to encourage good practices in developing DPI and in using DPGs.

=== Examples ===
In various sectors, including information science, education, finance, and healthcare, there are technologies that may be considered digital public goods as defined above.

Wikipedia has been cited as an example of a digital public good. Another example is DHIS2, an open-source health management system.

Free and open-source software (FOSS) is also frequently identified as a digital public good. Because FOSS is licensed to be shared freely, modified, and redistributed, it is available in a manner consistent with the principles of digital public goods.

Open educational resources, which are designed to be freely re-used, revised, and shared under their copyright terms, are another example often associated with digital public goods.

== Free and open-source software ==
The original motivation of the free software movement was political, aiming to preserve the freedom for all to study, copy, modify, and re-distribute software and code. Given the negligible marginal costs of duplicating software, free and open-source software (FOSS) is often considered a digital public good. FOSS has facilitated the wider dissemination of software in society. Since FOSS applications can be customized, users can add local language interfaces (localization), thereby expanding the availability of the software to more users in different regions and societies where those languages are spoken.

In 2022, following the formalization of the Digital Public Goods (DPG) Charter, the Digital Impact Alliance (DIAL) and Digital Public Goods Alliance (DPGA) held a series of consultations. To support DPGs for the long term, one of the key takeaways was around the importance of supporting ongoing collaborations. The free-rider problem is a challenge for Open Source solutions, so incentives need to be set up to ensure that DPGs are properly maintained.

== Open educational resources ==
Copyright law typically designates digital content as "all rights reserved" by default. The open educational resources (OER) movement has popularized the use of "copyleft" licenses, such as the Creative Commons, which allow content to be freely re-used, shared, modified, and redistributed. As a result, OER is often classified as a digital public good. OER has contributed to reducing the costs of accessing learning materials in schools and higher education institutions in various countries. In India, the Ministry of Education has supported the development of the Indian Government's Digital Infrastructure for Knowledge Sharing (DIKSHA) OER portal, which enables teachers to upload and download materials for teaching and learning.

OER itself is created using editing and authoring software applications. The Commonwealth of Learning, an intergovernmental institution of the Commonwealth, has promoted the use of FOSS editors to create OER. It has also supported IT for Change in developing the Teachers' toolkit for creating and re-purposing OER using FOSS. This approach involves using one digital public good FOSS to expand another digital public good (OER).

== Open data ==
Digital public goods, as defined by the UN Secretary-General's High-level Panel on Digital Cooperation in The Age of Digital Interdependence includes open data.

Open data, especially in machine-readable formats, can be utilized by startups and enterprises to develop applications and services. This can potentially lead to interoperability on a large scale.

The UNCTAD Digital Economy Report 2019 suggests that the private sector could be commissioned to build the necessary infrastructure for data extraction, which could then be stored in a public data fund as part of a national data commons. Another approach being explored, such as in Barcelona, involves requiring companies through public procurement contracts to provide the data they collect to governments.

== Digital Public Goods Alliance ==
Digital badge for digital public goods

In mid-2019, the UN Secretary-General's High-level Panel on Digital Cooperation published The Age of Digital Interdependence. The report recommended advancing a global discussion on how stakeholders could collaborate more effectively to harness the potential of digital technologies for improving human well-being. Recommendation 1B of the report suggests "that a broad, multi-stakeholder alliance, involving the UN, create a platform for sharing digital public goods, engaging talent and pooling data sets, in a manner that respects privacy, in areas related to attaining the SDGs".

In response to this recommendation, the Governments of Norway and Sierra Leone, UNICEF and iSPIRT formally initiated the Digital Public Goods Alliance in late December 2019 as a follow-up to the High-level Panel.

Digital Public Goods Alliance

The subsequent UN Secretary-General's Roadmap for Digital Cooperation, published in June 2020, mentions the Digital Public Goods Alliance specifically as "a multi-stake-holder initiative responding directly to the lack of a 'go to' platform, as highlighted by the Panel in its report." The report also emphasizes the role of digital public goods in achieving the Sustainable Development Goals in low- and middle-income countries and calls on all stakeholders, including the UN, to support their development and implementation.

The DPGA serves as steward of the DPG Standard - a set of guidelines intended to help determine whether a solution qualifies for classification as a digital public good.

When a solution is reviewed against the DPG Standard and successfully achieves classification as a digital public good, it is listed in the DPG Registry. The DPGA maintains this registry of digital public goods and advocates for their implementation. Registered DPGs must:

- be openly licensed (with OSI-approved open-source licenses for software, Creative Commons licenses for open content collections, and Open Data Commons-approved licenses for open data collections),
- clearly document ownership of assets that the DPG produces,
- be usable with open alternatives to any restrictively-licensed dependencies,
- have a mechanism for extracting and importing non-PII data in a non-proprietary format,
- comply with data privacy regulations,
- adhere to standards and best practices,
- do no harm by design,
- demonstrate relevance to advancing the United Nations Sustainable Development Goals,
- and must have documentation of source code, use cases, and/or functional requirements.

DPGs that collect personally-identifiable data must demonstrate ensurance of "privacy, security and integrity of this data in addition to the steps taken to prevent adverse impacts resulting from its collection, storage and distribution"; DPGs that collect, store, or distribute content "must have policies identifying inappropriate and illegal content such as child sexual abuse materials in addition to processes for detecting, moderating, reporting and removing inappropriate/ illegal content", and DPGs that "facilitate interactions with or between users or contributors [must have] a process for users and contributors to protect themselves against grief, abuse, and harassment[... and] have system(s) to address the safety and security of underage users."

=== Examples ===
Examples of digital public goods
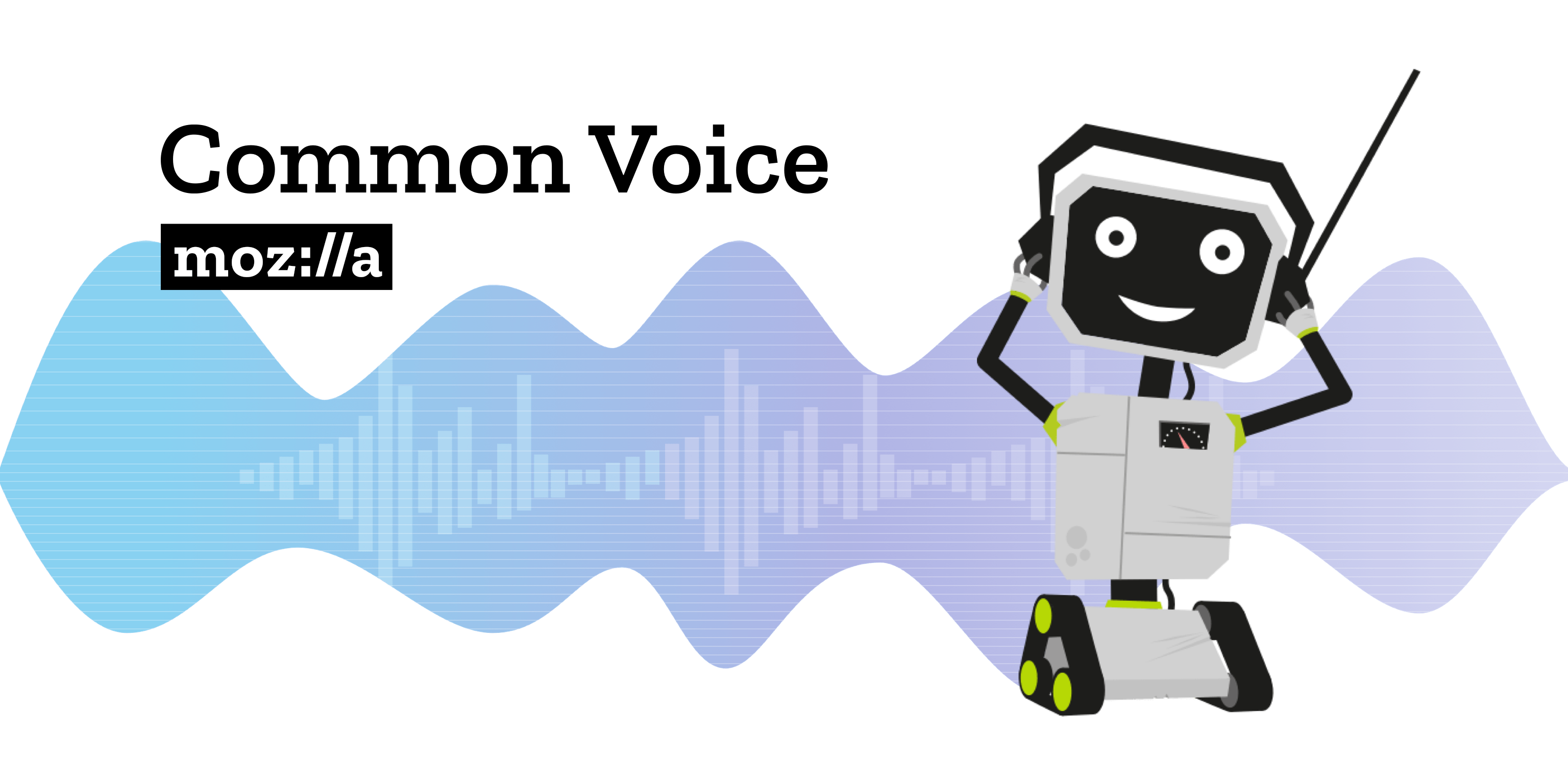
Common Voice for speech corpus

OpenStreetMap for mapping data

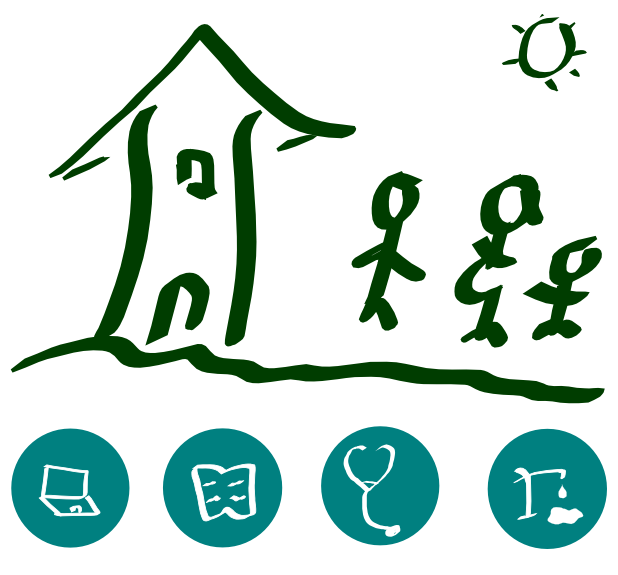
GNU Health for health systems

The DPGA publishes Annual Reports highlighting the work of DPGA members and providing examples of digital public goods creating advancements that result in lasting change.

These projects have been identified as Digital Public Goods

- Aam Digital
- African Storybook
- Agricultural Stress Index System (ASIS)
- AGROVOC Multilingual Thesaurus
- AGRIS
- CKAN
- Common Voice
- Creative Commons legal tools
- Decidim
- DHIS2
- Drupal
- Fedora Linux
- GlobaLeaks
- Global Human Settlement Layer
- GNU Health
- iHRIS
- Joomla!
- Legal Entity Identifier
- LibreOffice
- Mastodon
- Mifos Payment Hub
- ODK
- Open Food Facts
- openIMIS
- OpenMRS
- OpenStreetMap
- Orthanc (server)
- Rocky Linux
- QGIS
- SUSE Linux Enterprise Server
- Tor Browser
- Torkel Opsahl Academic EPublisher
- TYPO3
- Wikidata
- Wikipedia
- X-Road

== See also ==
- Digital public infrastructure
- Global commons
- Global Digital Compact
- Global public good
- Public infrastructure
- Open-source appropriate technology
- Open source
- Open data
- Ethics of technology
- Sustainable development
- Open-design movement
- Applied sustainability
- Technogaianism
