= NextGen Healthcare =

American software and services company

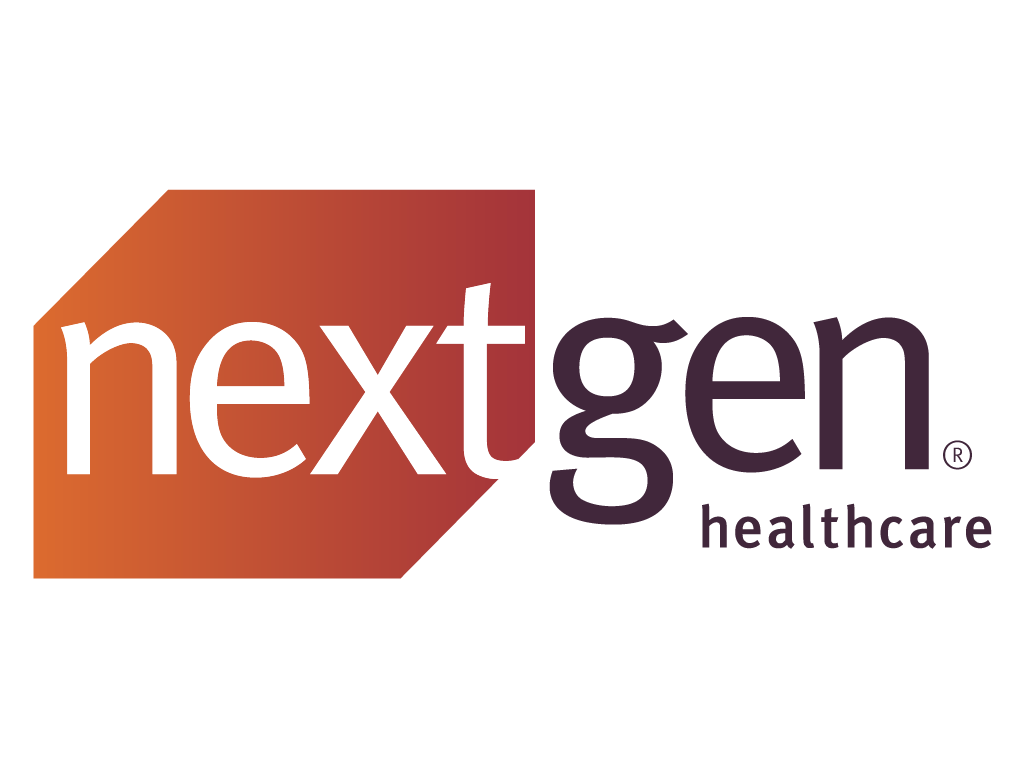
- Type: Private
- Traded as: Nasdaq: NXGN
- Industry: Health IT (Health Informatics)
- Predecessor: Quality Systems, Inc.
- Founded: 1973; 53 years ago
- Founder: Sheldon Razin
- Headquarters: Irvine, California, U.S.
- Area served: US
- Products: electronic health records, revenue cycle management, medical billing, patient engagement and population health management
- Owner: Thoma Bravo (2023–)
- Number of employees: 2,900 (September 2018); 1,500 (July 2011)
- Website: nextgen.com

NextGen Healthcare, Inc. is an American software and services company headquartered in Irvine, California. The company develops and sells electronic health record (EHR) software and practice management systems to the healthcare industry, as part of a range of software, services and analytics solutions for medical and dental practices. On September 7, 2018, Quality Systems, Inc. changed its name to NextGen Healthcare, Inc. and on September 10, their stock ticker symbol changed to NASDAQ: NXGN.

In 2023, private equity firm Thoma Bravo acquired NextGen Healthcare for $1.8 billion.

== History ==
Quality Systems, Inc. (QSI) was formed by Sheldon Razin in 1973 in Corona, California, as a dental software company. Sheldon started QSI in his home study with $2,000. It went on to become incorporated in April 1974.

In December 1982, QSI went public through NASDAQ under the symbol QSII.

In 1994, Clinitec was formed by Pat Cline and Bryan Rosenberger to sell software for converting paper medical records into electronic medical records. After acquiring a smaller interest in 1995, QSI purchased the remaining equity of Clinitec in 1996.

In May 1997, QSI purchased Micromed, which provided front- and back office practice management software. In April 1999, QSI combined Clinitec and MicroMed into one operating division to create the MicroMed division, which was later renamed NextGen Healthcare Information Systems division in 2001.

In 2008, NextGen Healthcare then acquired HSI of St. Louis, Missouri, and Practice Management Partners of Hunt Valley, Maryland, to expand its billing services and revenue cycle consulting division.

In 2009, NextGen Healthcare updated the name of its electronic medical record system from NextGen EMR to NextGen EHR.

In February 2010, Quality Systems entered into an agreement to acquire Opus Healthcare Solutions, Inc. and announced it would be integrated with the assets of Sphere Health Systems, Inc., which were acquired by QSI in August 2009. Both software and services companies for the inpatient market would become part of NextGen Healthcare.

Pat Cline retired from NextGen in 2011, and started up a new health informatics venture: Lightbeam Health Solutions.

In 2013, Quality Systems acquired Mirth Corporation, developers of Mirth Connect, a popular open-source integration engine used by thousands of healthcare entities.

In 2013, NextGen was ranked as one of the Top 20 Most Popular EHR Software Solutions on the market by Capterra.

In 2014, NextGen earned KLAS Top Performance Honors for Ambulatory RCM Services.

On October 30, 2015, Quality Systems announced an agreement to acquire HealthFusion for $165 million-plus potential additional contingent consideration of up to $25 million. Based in San Diego, Calif., HealthFusion was a privately held developer of web-based software for physicians, hospitals and medical billing services.

In September 2018, Quality Systems changed its corporate name to NextGen Healthcare, Inc., and its Nasdaq ticker changed from QSII to NXGN.

In October 2019, NextGen Healthcare acquired Topaz Information Solutions.

In November 2019, NextGen Healthcare announced the acquisition of Medfusion and completed the acquisition in December 2019.

In December 2019, NextGen Healthcare announced an agreement to acquire OTTO Health

In September 2023, Thoma Bravo announced it would take NextGen Healthcare private for a total enterprise value of $1.8 billion, which was finalized couple of months later.

== Products and services ==
NextGen Healthcare's products include:

- NextGen Enterprise Ambulatory EHR (Electronic Health Record). The NextGen EHR is primarily a single, all-encompassing database that combines user management, EHR and EPM. This database can run under MS SQL Server 2005, 2008 or Oracle.
- NextGen Practice Management. Shares the same database backend as the core EHR product.
- NextGen Office
- NextGen Patient Portal
- NextGen Health Data Hub
- NextGen Health Quality Measures
- NextGen Advanced Auditing
- NextGen Mobile
- NextGen Rosetta interface platform
- Mirth Connect acquired September 2013

NextGen Healthcare's services include:

- Revenue Cycle Management (RCM)
- NextGen EDI Services
- NextGuard Data Protection

=== Former products ===
- NextGen Inpatient Clinicals acquired by Quadramed in 2015
- NextGen Inpatient Financials acquired by Quadramed in 2015
