= Tidepool (company) =

American diabetes management software company

- Company type: Non-profit
- Industry: Healthcare software, diabetes management
- Founded: 2013; 13 years ago in San Francisco, California
- Headquarters: San Francisco, California, United States
- Products: Tidepool Web, Tidepool Mobile, Tidepool Loop
- Website: www.tidepool.org

Tidepool is a non-profit software organisation founded in 2013 in San Francisco, California, which develops open-source tools to help people manage diabetes. Its work spans data visualisation platforms for diabetes device data and, most notably, Tidepool Loop, an open-source automated insulin delivery (AID) system. The organisation works with device manufacturers including Medtronic and Dexcom to support interoperability across insulin pumps and continuous glucose monitors.

== Products ==
Tidepool's core products include:

- Tidepool Web — a data visualisation platform that aggregates data from a wide range of diabetes devices, including insulin pumps, continuous glucose monitors and blood glucose meters, allowing users and clinicians to review trends over time.
- Tidepool Mobile — a companion mobile application for logging meals, exercise and other contextual information alongside device data.
- Tidepool Loop — an open-source automated insulin delivery system that links a compatible continuous glucose monitor with an insulin pump to automate basal insulin dosing based on glucose readings. Tidepool Loop received FDA 510(k) clearance, making it the first FDA-cleared open-source AID application.

== Interoperability ==
A central objective of Tidepool's work is promoting interoperability among diabetes devices, enabling patients to mix and match components from different manufacturers rather than being locked into proprietary closed-loop systems. The organisation collaborated with Medtronic on an interoperable automated insulin pump approach.
