= IT for Change =

Indian nongovernmental organization

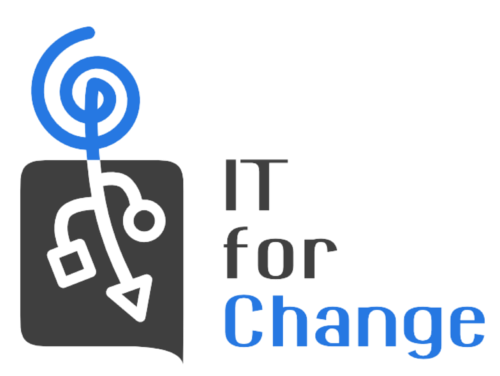
- Abbreviation: ITfC
- Type: Non-profit organization
- Headquarters: No 393, 17th Main, 4th T Block, Jayanagar, Bangalore, Karnataka, India
- Coordinates: 12.924927°N 77.588999°E
- Website: itforchange.net

IT for Change is a non-governmental organization (NGO) based in Bengaluru, India, whose goal is to build a society where digital technologies contribute to human rights, social justice, and equity. It is especially known internationally for its critical and progressive approach to technology. IT for Change is in Special Consultative Status with the United Nations Economic and Social Council and works in the areas of Internet Governance, Education, and Gender.

== Feminist Digital Justice ==
Together with the DAWN network, IT for Change has promoted an international declaration on Feminist Digital Justice that denounces digital capitalism and proposes that technologies be used for care work and women's autonomy, instead of for surveillance or control.

== Gender-based Hate Speech ==
Through the "Recognize-Resist-Remedy" project, IT for Change worked to identify and combat gender-based hate speech, understanding that digital violence is a real barrier preventing women from participating in public life. The project began in 2019, initially focusing on India and Brazil with InternetLab funded by IDRC.

== Education ==
IT for Change advocates for a community-driven, public system-focused approach to educational technology, prioritizing Teacher Professional Development through Open Educational Resources (OER). With support from Friedrich Ebert Foundation, IT for Change worked on the framework that emphasizes critical AI governance in education, advocating for equity, data privacy, and the use of Free and Open-Source Software (FOSS) over commercial EdTech.
