= Breathing Games =

- Formation: 2014; 11 years ago
- Location: Geneva, Switzerland
- Website: http://www.breathinggames.net

Breathing Games is an open access health commons that aims to promote respiratory health through games for health and open source hardware released under copyleft licences. Breathing Games leads collaborations with hospitals and universities in Canada, France, Switzerland, Italy and South Korea, and is a member of the Global Alliance against chronic Respiratory Diseases.

The commons builds on open collaboration and peer production to design and develop education and treatment games and hardware for asthma, cystic fibrosis, and COPD.

In 2020, Breathing Games organized a joint event between the Geneva Health Forum and Open Geneva to promote open-source health technologies.

== In the media ==
Breathing Games is presented through its collaboration with the peer to peer network Sensorica in the documentary A new Economy, directed by Trevor Meier.

In March 2019, the Swiss Television reports on an event organized by Breathing Games during the OpenGeneva festival.

== Funding ==
Breathing Games is funded by public research funds (Canadian Institutes of Health Research, French Hospitals Federation – Fonds FHF, European Union OpenCare) and by a private foundation.

== Awards ==
In 2019, Breathing Games was a Citypreneurs finalist, a contest hosted by the City of Seoul and United Nations agencies to find solutions to the global goals.

== See also ==
- Free software
- Open-source hardware
- Sharing economy
- Digital revolution
