= Caisis =

Patient data management system

- Developer(s): Caisis Team
- Stable release: 6.0 / February 2, 2012; 13 years ago
- Written in: C#, XML, HTML, JavaScript
- Operating system: Windows
- Type: Medical software
- License: GNU General Public License Version 2
- Website: www.caisis.org

Caisis is an open-source, web-based, patient data management system that integrates research with patient care. The system is freely distributed to promote the collection of standard, well structured data suitable for research and multi-institution collaboration.

== History ==
Caisis was designed around structured chronological patient histories which could be displayed to clinicians and processed by computer algorithms. The system was initiated in the Department of Urology at Memorial Sloan–Kettering Cancer Center in 2002 and has been actively developed by BioDigital Systems and a number of other institutions worldwide. It is released under the GNU General Public License (GPL) and is entirely web based; written mainly in C#, HTML, and JavaScript it runs on the .Net Framework. The installer, source code and documentation are available from its website. Although it is widely used in cancer research the framework allows rapid adoption for collecting data on a multitude of disease states.

== Features ==
- Open source freely available web application
- Clinical practice and research activities combined to
- improve data quality and efficiency
- Designed to be easily extended to new diseases
- Framework allows quick addition of new fields and
- data collection using electronic forms
- Clinical documentation integrated via paper and
- web-based forms (eForms)
- Integrated protocol management module
- Integrated specimen banking module
- Integrated project tracking module
- Data export tools and disease specific algorithms
- Plugin interface for user friendly tools (e.g. PSA graph, file upload tool)
- Longitudinal follow-up automation
- HIPAA compliant robust security features

== Other modules ==
- Specimen Banking
  - Specimen tracking that includes details about specimen handling, tests, and storage
  - Interface to define storage setup
  - Specimen transfer tracking
  - Specimen search based on clinical or pathological details
- Protocol / Clinical Trials Management
  - Patient study calendar that integrates the patient schedule and data entry
  - Serious adverse event reportingOutcomes management for Biomarker, Soft Tissue, and Bone response
  - Data entry customization by protocol
  - Registration and Eligibility tracking
- eAuditor
  - This is a third partly tool, developed by The Breast Cancer Tissue Bank BCTB in Australia, for checking data accuracy in an efficient way.
