= ClearHealth =

- Developer(s): Open source community
- Initial release: 2003; 22 years ago
- Repository: https://github.com/clearhealth/clearhealth
- Written in: PHP
- Operating system: Cross-platform
- Available in: Multilingual
- Type: Medical software
- License: GNU General Public License
- Website: clear-health.com

ClearHealth was previously an open-source practice management (PM) and electronic medical records (EMR/EHR/PHR) system available under the GNU General Public License. However, ClearHealth has been acquired by Optum Inc and the public source code repository has not received updates since 2013.

It has received attention as a possible open-source option for FQHC and CHC sites.

== History ==
ClearHealth began when the core developers of several other open source healthcare software systems including OpenEMR and FreeMed.

In 2006, the Tides Foundation provided a grant which funded the development of a set of feature additions to support the specialized needs of Federally Qualified Health Centers (FQHC) and other CHC/RNC facilities.

Written in the PHP language and capable of running on most server configurations, Windows, Linux or macOS, under Apache and MySQL (LAMP).

Amongst several open source services for the healthcare industry, the California Healthcare Foundation identified ClearHealth specifically as a viable service based on its evaluation of sites and support in its Open Source Primer on healthcare software.

== Features ==
ClearHealth is a comprehensive practice management and EMR system incorporating scheduling, patient registration, electronic medical records and CPOE, electronic and paper billing, and SQL reporting. As an open source reference implementation of several interoperability protocols, ClearHealth has support for working with data in HL7 and Continuity of Care Record (CCR) formats.

The ClearHealth system is fully compliant with HIPAA security provisions.

== Deployments ==
It is currently deployed at approximately 600 sites worldwide including commercially supported and self-supported open source installations. There are a number installations in non-profit health settings including the Primary Care Coalition network, powering the Community Healthlink System, in Maryland, USA, which includes approximately 50 sites and 1,500 users and Operation Samahan, a Federally Qualified Health Center (FQHC) look alike facility in National City, CA with 5 locations. OsNews provides an introduction to the system.
