= THIRRA =

- Developer: PCDOM
- Stable release: 2012-02-29 (0.9.14) / February 2012
- Operating system: Cross-platform
- Type: Medical Software
- License: Mozilla Public License
- Website: thirra.primacare.org.my

THIRRA is an open-source web-based Electronic Health Records (EHR) System. The name THIRRA was derived from its project title Portable System for TeleHealth and Health Informatics for Rural and Remote Areas.

== History ==
The THIRRA project was one of the pioneer eHealth telemedicine projects under the PANACeA network, funded by the International Development Research Centre. It was conceptualised in February 2007, with partners from Primary Care Doctors Organisation Malaysia (PCDOM), Sri Lanka Health Telematics, Healthnet Nepal and ICCDR,B of Bangladesh.

== Features of THIRRA ==
The main component of THIRRA is the Electronic Health Records System. Besides the EHR, it also has the Biosurveillance mode, that enables Public Health Departments to monitor and investigate infectious diseases outbreaks.

THIRRA can be used in an offline mobile mode, where no reliance on the Internet is required. Data is stored on the mobile devices such as laptops and netbooks. The users can synchronise the data with the main server when they return to the clinic/hospital.

THIRRA was written in the PHP programming language, using the CodeIgniter framework. The application is based on the Hierarchical Model View Controller (HMVC) design pattern, using the Modular Extension extension. This makes THIRRA modular by nature.

It stores data in the PostgreSQL database system and uses the JQuery UI JavaScript framework for its Web 2.0 functionalities.

THIRRA is also integrated with another open source software called Generic Engine for Modules to expand its modules. Modules can be created by the health care professionals without requiring any programming knowledge.

It provides ICD-10 classification for diagnosis and LOINC for coding of labs and imaging orders.

== License ==
THIRRA was released under the Mozilla Public License version 1.1.
