= Mirth Connect =

Cross-platform interface engine

- Developer: NextGen Healthcare
- Release: July 18, 2006; 20 years ago
- Written in: Java
- Operating system: Cross-platform
- Type: Integration engine
- License: Mozilla Public License 2.0
- Website: www.nextgen.com/products-and-services/integration-engine
- Repository: github.com/nextgenhealthcare/connect/

Mirth Connect is a proprietary cross-platform interface engine used in the healthcare industry that enables the management of information using bi-directional sending of many types of messages. The primary use of this interface engine is in healthcare.

On September 9, 2013 Mirth Corporation announced they were acquired by Quality Systems (now NextGen Healthcare).

As of March 2025, Nextgen Healthcare announced Mirth Connect will become a single licensed, commercial product and the open-source free version can continue to be used but will no longer be updated.

== Alternatives ==
Following NextGen Healthcare's announcement in March 2025 that Mirth Connect would transition to a single commercial licensing model, several open-source alternatives have emerged:

- Open Integration Engine (OIE) – A vendor-neutral, community-driven fork of Mirth Connect that continues open-source development
- BridgeLink – An open-source fork of Mirth Connect sponsored by Innovar Healthcare to ensure continued community access to healthcare integration tools
