= Institute for the Management of Information Systems =

- Abbreviation: IMIS
- Formation: 1978
- Headquarters: United Kingdom
- Website: http://www.imis.org.uk/

The Institute for the Management of Information Systems (IMIS), previously called the Institute of Data Processing Management (IDPM), was an international association in the field of Information Systems Management. It was headquartered in the United Kingdom, and had approximately 12,000 members the majority of whom resided outside the UK. The institute was founded in 1978 and was a registered charity. On May 3, 2013, IMIS voted to merge into the British Computer Society and ceased to exist.

Since their early establishment, the IMIS (formerly the IDPM) and the British Computer Society (BCS) have been regarded as the two main UK professional institutes for computer professionals. In a Press Release dated 3 May 2013, the BCS announced that "Following an overwhelming majority vote from its membership, the Institute for the Management of Information Systems (IMIS), has ratified its decision to merge with BCS, The Chartered Institute for IT, with immediate effect. The agreement will see all IMIS professional members transfer into BCS membership".

== IMIS Qualifications ==
IMIS qualifications are divided into three levels:

- Foundation Diploma
- Diploma
- Higher Diploma

Files of each course syllabus are available from the institute in PDF format via their website.

=== Foundation Diploma ===
This course is suitable for young people who want to work with computers and need some entry-level education. All modules defined within the course structure may be taken individually or collectively to form a Foundation Diploma. Each module is designed to introduce the student to the basic elements of information systems practices.

=== Diploma ===
Completion of these examinations awards a Diploma Certificate and Licentiate grade of professional membership. The general standard equates to the National (ONC) Certificate. Candidates having completed the Diploma course are working at the equivalent level of early entry analysts.

=== Higher Diploma ===
The Higher Diploma extends and complements the Diploma course to give students a comprehensive knowledge of the entire field of operations, programming, systems analysis and design, and computer management. Access at this level is also available to candidates who comply with the entrance requirements which can be found on the IMIS website page. Completion of these examinations awards a Higher Diploma Certificate and Associate grade of professional membership. The general standard equates to the Higher National Certificate/Diploma (HNC/HND) and prepares candidates for work at the equivalent level of analyst/team leader.

After gaining their academic IMIS qualifications students can become full Members (or later Fellows) of the institute.

== IMIS Journal ==
The institute's professional publication, the IMIS Journal, is a quarterly magazine circulated to the organization's 12,000+ members, as well as business leaders, policy makers, and academic institutions. The editorial content contains coverage and analysis of current people, events, and topics of interest to senior managers working in an information systems setting. There is also a section of the IMIS Journal devoted to college and student members. The journal is currently distributed only online.
