= OpenMRS =

Open-source Project for Software Development

OpenMRS Reference Application

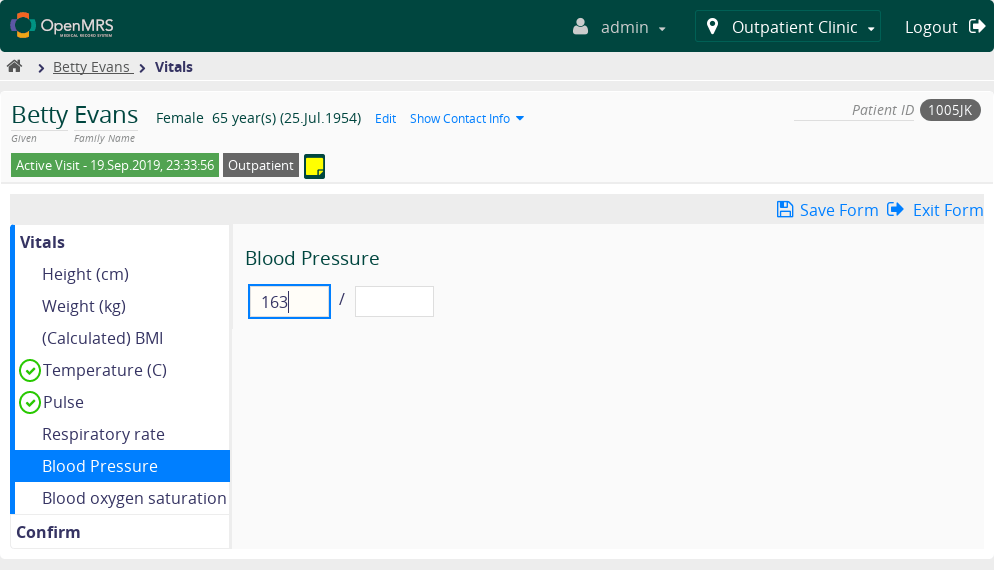
- Stable release: 3.2.1 / 23 January 2025; 12 months ago
- Written in: Java
- Operating system: Linux, Mac OS X, Windows
- Type: Electronic medical records
- License: MPLv2.0 with Healthcare Disclaimer
- Website: openmrs.org

OpenMRS Platform
- Initial release: May 2014; 11 years ago
- Stable release: 2.7.0 / 9 December 2024; 14 months ago
- License: MPLv2.0 with Healthcare Disclaimer
- Website: openmrs.org

OpenMRS is a collaborative open-source project to develop software to support the delivery of health care in developing countries.

OpenMRS is founded on the principles of openness and sharing of ideas, software and strategies for deployment and use. The system is designed to be usable in very resource poor environments and can be modified with the addition of new data items, forms and reports without programming. It is intended as a platform that many organizations can adopt and modify avoiding the need to develop a system from scratch.

OpenMRS, Inc. is a registered non-profit that is the owner of all OpenMRS materials and the maintainer of the software's Public License. This entity will represent the OpenMRS project in legal and financial matters.

== License ==
The software is licensed under the Mozilla Public License version 2.0 with an added "Healthcare Disclaimer". It requires that recipients are entitled to freely access the source code, but allows binary distribution, modification of the code (under the same license) and bundling into larger products that are under different licenses.

== History ==
OpenMRS grew out of the critical need to scale up the treatment of HIV in Africa but from the start was conceived as a general purpose electronic medical record system that could support the full range of medical treatments. The first ideas and prototype of OpenMRS were conceived by Paul Biondich and Burke Mamlin from the Regenstrief Institute, Indiana on a visit to the Academic Model Providing Access to Healthcare (AMPATH) project in Eldoret, Kenya in February 2004. Around the same time the EMR team at Partners In Health led by Hamish Fraser and Darius Jazayeri were looking at ways to scale up the PIH-EMR web-based medical record system developed to manage drug resistant tuberculosis in Peru, and HIV in rural Haiti. Paul, Burke and Hamish met in September 2004 at the Medinfo conference in San Francisco, and recognized they had a common approach to medical information systems and a similar philosophy for healthcare and development and OpenMRS was born. Later, Chris Seebregts of the South African Medical Research Council became the fourth founding member. In 2005, Dr. Andrew S. Kanter from Columbia University joined the team. Dr. Kanter was directing the Millennium Villages Project's (MVP) health information systems and selected OpenMRS for use in the ten MVP countries in sub-Saharan Africa.

== Design ==
The OpenMRS code is based on a "concept dictionary" that describes all the data items that can be stored in the system such as clinical findings, laboratory test results or socio-economic data. This approach avoids the need to modify the database structure to add new diseases, for example, and facilitates sharing of data dictionaries between projects and sites. An important feature of OpenMRS is its modular construction which allows the programming of new functions without modifying the core code. OpenMRS is web based but can be deployed on a single laptop or on a large server and runs on Linux, Windows or Mac OS X.

Other key features of OpenMRS:

- Built on the MySQL database (but uses Hibernate allowing it to be ported to other databases)
- Programmed in Java
- Includes tools for data export and reporting
- Versions currently exist for HIV/AIDS, Drug resistant TB, primary care and oncology
- Supports open standards for medical data exchange including HL7, FHIR, LOINC and IXF
- Form-based tools, such as the Form Entry module and XForms module
- Provides access to between-release code through "Continuous Deployment"
- Bidirectional synchronization with systems such as Mobile Technology for Community Health (MOTECH) and the Treatment and Research AIDS Centre's TRACnet system
- The Atlas module, which gives information on all OpenMRS facilities using a visual map
- Can be integrated with SMS messaging

New features (OpenMRS 1.9 and later):

- Allows older versions to run without upgrading
- Tools to link to hand held devices and cell phones (using JavaRosa)
- Research data collection tools for clinical trials and community data collection projects
- New Columbia International eHealth Laboratory (CIEL) dictionary entries
- Patient dashboard tab-loading rendered on-demand via AJAX to decrease lag

Currently being tested/developed:

- API support for order entry that provides support of orders within the system
- HL7 Fast Healthcare Interoperability Resources (FHIR) support for OpenMRS
- Anatomical drawing tool with pre-loads image and blank canvas options
- User interface improvements
- Ebola treatment unit electronic medical record as a response to the 2014 Ebola epidemic
- Message delivery triggered by a trend in data entry

== Deployments ==
The first deployment was in Eldoret, Kenya in February 2006 followed by the PIH-supported hospital in Rwinkwavu, Rwanda in August 2006 and Richmond Hospital in the KwaZulu-Natal province of South Africa later that year. As of March 2010, OpenMRS is in use in at least 23 developing countries (mostly in Africa) and it has been used to record over 1 million patient records around the world. Most deployments are run by independent groups who carry out the work on the ground with technical support and training provided by the core team of OpenMRS developers, and other implementers. There have been four annual OpenMRS meetings in South Africa, organized by Chris Seebregts, who also leads the OpenMRS implementers community. Shorter meetings were held in Boston in May 2009, and a developer training in Indianapolis in February 2010. There are five known deployments supporting clinical care in the US - three in Indianapolis, one in Los Angeles, and one in Maryland. OpenMRS use will be expanded in Haiti to assist with the patients recovering from the January 2010 earthquake. In Nigeria, Institute of Human Virology is pushing for OpenMRS penetration in public and private clinics. The institute had a pilot of OpenMRS in 2011 to manage HIV/AIDs patients' records in 27 health facilities, the outcome of the pilot was overwhelming. In 2013, the institute decided to scale-up on OpenMRS and scale-down paper-based systems in all its over 400 health facilities and sub-partners' facilities. There has been tremendous progress in this scale-up.

== Distributions ==
An OpenMRS Distribution is a particular configuration of the OpenMRS Platform, OpenMRS modules, content (concepts, forms, reports, etc.) and other integrated applications, that can be installed and upgraded as a unit. Distributions can be general purpose, targeted at a specific clinical or geographic use case, or specific to a single consumer.

The OpenMRS Reference Application is maintained by the OpenMRS community. This distribution is an extensible facility EMR.

ThoughtWorks maintains a general purpose OpenMRS distribution called Bahmni. It is an easily configurable out-of-the-box EMR and hospital information system.

OpenMRS distributions targeted at specific countries are available for Mozambique (eSaude), Kenya (KenyaEMR), and Uganda (UgandaEMR). Several other distributions are available, or currently being built.

== Support ==
OpenMRS is supported by core teams from Partners In Health, Regenstrief Institute, and the South African Medical Research Council. Other organizations that collaborate on OpenMRS are the Millennium Villages Project, based at Columbia University, and Baobab Health Systems in Malawi. Some institutes have extended financial and consulting support as well, including The United States Centers for Disease Control, the Rockefeller Foundation, and the World Health Organization. A variety of organizations, such as Atlassian, Blueberry Software, and YourKit, have also donated licenses to OpenMRS developers. There are several groups of programmers working on OpenMRS in developing countries including Kenya, Rwanda, Uganda, South Africa, Pakistan, Chile, and India. In Rwanda, Partners In Health started local training program called E-Health Software Development and Implementation (EHSDI). The nine-month course was designed to train students in medical information systems, and it focused highly in using the OpenMRS platform.

== Community ==
The OpenMRS community includes developers, implementers, and users from multiple countries who collaborate through mailing lists, IRC, and annual conferences. Each year, OpenMRS hosts their annual Implementers' Conference; a global meet up of developers and implementers hosted by different countries where OpenMRS is being used on a national scale.

OpenMRS has participated annually in Google Summer of Code since 2007; according to that program's manager, it receives more student applications than the Apache Software Foundation. In the summer of 2013, OpenMRS participated as a mentoring organization in the Outreach Program for Women. OpenMRS also held a three-day leadership retreat, OpenMRS Camp 2014, at Bradford Woods. The focus of the camp was to build strategies for growing the OpenMRS community and ensuring its success. OpenMRS held its first OpenMRS Code Jam on November 19, 2014 in Toronto, where it was hosted by ThoughtWorks. OpenMRS is a mentoring organization in Google Code-in 2015.

== See also ==
- eHealth
- Electronic medical record
- Health informatics
- List of open-source health software
