= Debian Pure Blend =

Linux distribution

A Debian Pure Blend is a project completely inside Debian targeting a server or a desktop installation in very broad and general terms.

A Debian Pure Blend aims to cover the interests of specialised users, who might be children, lawyers, medical staff, visually impaired people, certain academic fields, etc. The common goal of those is to make installation and administration of computers for their target users as easy as possible, and to serve in the role as the missing link between software developers and users well.

== Technical ==
Linux distribution that is configured to support a particular target group out-of-the-box. All changes and improvements are integrated to the official Debian repositories. A Debian Pure Blend can contain multiple flavors (or profiles) (e.g., Debian Edu has flavors for main-server, workstation, and thin-client-server).

Technically a Debian Pure Blend builds a set of metapackages and provides an overview about the packages which are included and which are on the todo list for further inclusion. Both pages are rendered from the information inside the tasks files in an SVN.

Most of the distributions based on Debian, like for example Knoppix or Sacix, are not Debian Pure Blends, and Ubuntu is not even binary compatible with Debian. Linux Mint Debian Edition is binary compatible with Debian, but is also not a Debian Pure Blend.

== Existing Debian Pure Blends ==
- Debian Junior: Debian for children "from 1 to 99"
- Debian-Med: Debian in Health Care
- Debian Edu: Debian for Education
- Debian GIS: Debian with many geographic information system-Packages, e.g. GRASS GIS, QGIS, GPSPrune, QLandkarteGT, et al.
- Debian Astro: Debian for professional and amateur astronomers
- DebiChem: Debian for chemists
- Hamradio: Debian for radio amateurs
- Debian Accessibility
- Debian Science
- Debian Accessibility Project
- FreedomBox

== Debian-Med ==
The Debian Med project is a Debian Pure Blend created to provide a co-ordinated operating system and collection of available free software packages that are well-suited for the requirements for medical practices and medical research. Debian Med does not create or program software, but integrates software available under a license conforming to the DFSG into Debian and also extends Debian to be a better platform for this field of interest. The Debian Software Repositories contain over 51,000 packages. Debian Med serves as a magnifying lens to categorize all those packages, that are suited for the field of medicine.

=== Categories ===
Debian includes over 51,000 packages, many of those being the focus of Debian Med. These are being summarized into categories called tasks:

- Medical practice and Patient management
- Molecular Biology and Medical Genetics
- Medical imaging
- Drug databases
- Psychology
- and several others

== See also ==
- Fedora Robotics
- Robotics suite
- For medical records:
  - Electronic health record
  - Health informatics
  - Fastra II
