= Medical practice management software =

Medical practice management software (PMS) is a category of healthcare software that deals with the day-to-day operations of a medical practice including veterinarians. Such software frequently allows users to capture patient demographics, schedule appointments, maintain lists of insurance payors, perform billing tasks, and generate reports.

In the United States, most PMS systems are designed for small to medium-sized medical offices. Some of the software is designed for or used by third-party medical billing companies. PMS is often divided among desktop-only software, client-server software, or Internet-based software.

The desktop-only variety is intended to be used only on one computer by one or a handful of users sharing access. Client-server software typically necessitates that the practice acquire or lease server equipment and operate the server software on that hardware, while individual users' workstations contain client software that accesses the server. Client-server software's advantage is in allowing multiple users to share the data and the workload; a major disadvantage is the cost of running the server. Internet-based software is a relatively newer breed of PMS. Such software decreases the need for the practice to run their own server and worry about security and reliability. However, such software removes patient data from the practice's premises, which can be seen as a security risk of its own.

PMS is often connected to electronic medical records (EMR) systems. While some information in a PMS and an EMR overlaps — for example, patient and provider data — in general the EMR system is used for the assisting the practice with clinical matters, while PMS is used for administrative and financial matters. Medical practices often hire different vendors to provide the EMR and PMS systems. The integration of the EMR and PMS software is considered one of the most challenging aspects of the medical practice management software implementation.

== Components of practice management software ==
Most practice management software contains systems that allow users to enter and track patients, schedule and track patient appointments, send out insurance claims and patient statements as part of the collection process, process insurance, patient and third party payments, and generate reports for the administrative and clinical staff of the practice. Typically, using a PMS also involves keeping up to date large sets of data including lists of diagnosis and procedures, lists of insurance companies, referring physicians, providers, facilities, and much more.

=== Appointment scheduling ===
Practice management systems often include a calendaring or scheduling component that allows staff to create and track upcoming patient visits. Software is often differentiated by whether it allows double-booking, or whether it uses scheduling or a booking model. Schedules are often color-coded to allow healthcare providers (i.e. doctors, nurses, assistants) to easily identify blocks of time or sets of patients.

=== Claims and statements ===
If the patient carried a valid private or public insurance policy at the time these services were provided, the charges are then sent out as an insurance claim. The process of sending charges may happen on paper, usually with the use of the CMS-1500 form. This form lists the provider who performed the service, the patient, the services performed and the related diagnoses. For institutional (typically hospital) charges, claims may also be sent out on the UB-04 forms (formerly the UB-92 which use of was discontinued in 2007). Claims may also be sent out electronically using industry-standard electronic data interchange standards.

In most cases, electronic claims are submitted using an automated software process. Some practice management system vendors will update CPT/ICD-10 codes in the Practice Software on an annual basis. Some, especially smaller firms, leave it entirely up to medical practices. While a lot of insurance payers have created methods for direct submission of electronic claims, many software vendors or practice users use the services of an electronic claim clearinghouse to submit their claims. Such clearinghouses commonly maintain connections to a large number of payers and make it easy for practices to submit claims to any of these payers. Instead of creating a connection to every payer, the practice user or software vendor must only connect to the clearinghouse.

Once a claim is adjudicated by the payer, some sort of response is sent to the submitter. This usually comes as a paper Explanation of Benefits (EOB) or an Electronic Remittance Advice (ERA). These describe the actions that the payer took on each claim: amounts paid, denied, adjusted, etc.

In cases where a patient did not have proper insurance, or where insurance coverage did not fully pay the charges, the practice will usually send out patient statements. Practice management software often contains ways for a practice to print and mail their own statements (or other correspondence), and may even contain a way to interface to third-party patient statement printing companies.

=== Reporting ===
Almost invariably, the process of running a medical practice requires some introspection, and practice management software usually contains reporting capabilities to allow users to extract detailed data on financial performance and patient financial histories. PMS often has both pre-setup reports and allows users to design their own, ad-hoc reports. In some cases, the reporting functionality of PMS interfaces with decision support systems or has similar functionality built-in.

== Practice management software and commerce ==
The global veterinary PMS industry size was estimated to be 323 million in 2016 with more than 120 million from United States. Veterinary PMS is expected to be growing at the rate of 8.9% per year. There are more than 20 different software available in the market for Veterinary PMS.

Practice management software (PMS) has traditionally been commercial; few viable free practice management systems exist, though a few open source systems are under development. PMS usually costs about $100 to tens of thousands of dollars to license and operate.

PMS often needs to interface with the outside world. There are a number of standards that are used:

- HL7 — used to communicate with hospitals, or EHR systems
- ANSI X12 EDI transactions, including:
  - 270 — eligibility & benefit inquiry - Is the patient an insured of this payer?
  - 271 — eligibility & benefit response (response to 270) - A yes or no response that the patient is insured.
  - 276 — claims status inquiry (follows 837 submissions)
  - 277 — claim status response (response to 276)
  - 835 — claim payment/advice (follows 837) - 837 medical claims is paid, and amount of payment and the patient's financial responsibility
  - 837D — claim submission for dental claims
  - 837I — claim submission for institutional claims
  - 837P — claim submission for professional claims

== Notable practice management software ==
Logo (100px)	Software	Developer	First released	Deployment	Primary market
	Athenahealth	Athenahealth	1997	Cloud	Ambulatory practices
	Epic Systems	Epic Systems	1979	Client-server, Cloud	Hospitals and physician groups
	Oracle Health (formerly Cerner)	Oracle Health	1979	Client-server, Cloud	Hospitals and health systems
	Veradigm (formerly Allscripts)	Veradigm	1986	Client-server, Cloud	Physician practices
	eClinicalWorks	eClinicalWorks	1999	Cloud	Ambulatory practices
	NextGen Healthcare	NextGen Healthcare	1974	Client-server, Cloud	Ambulatory practices

== See also ==
- List of open source healthcare software
- Electronic health record
- Health informatics
- Medical record
- Evaluation and Management Coding
