= Drishti (client) =

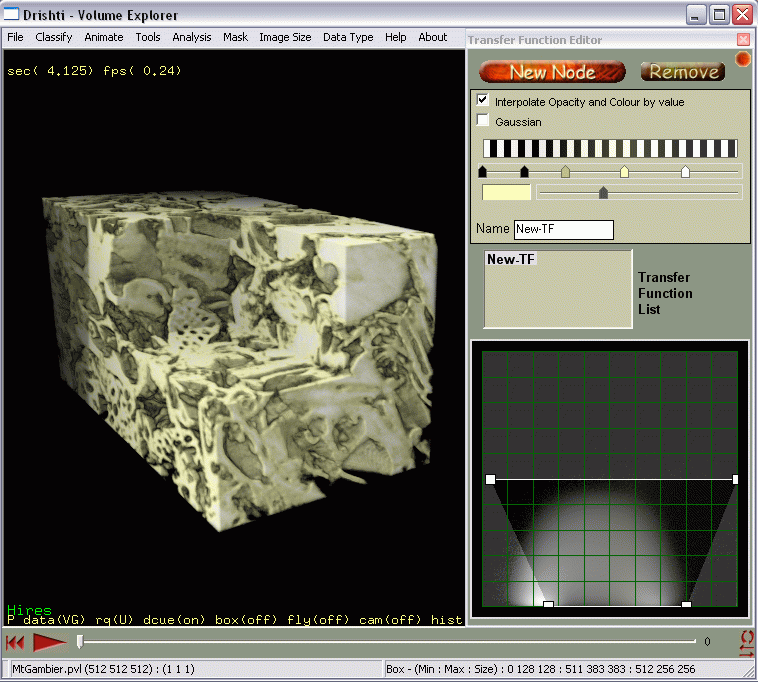
- The UI is Qt-based
- Original author(s): Ajay Limaye
- Developer(s): ANU Vizlab
- Stable release: 2.7 / Nov 10, 2020
- Repository: github.com/nci/drishti
- Operating system: Linux, Mac OS X, Microsoft Windows
- Type: Scientific visualization, Interactive visualization
- License: GNU General Public License Version 2
- Website: https://github.com/nci/drishti

Drishti (from Sanskrit दृष्टि dr̥ṣţi, meaning "vision" or "insight") is a multi-platform, open-source volume-exploration and presentation tool. Written for visualizing tomography data, electron-microscopy data and the like, it aims to ease understanding of data sets and to assist with conveying that understanding to the research community or to lay persons. From the website:

"The central idea about Drishti is that the scientists should be able to use it for exploring volumetric datasets as well as use it in presentations."

The Commonwealth Scientific and Industrial Research Organisation (CSIRO) in Australia has used Drishti for a number of purposes, such as volumetric visualisation of various computer-tomography datasets. The Australian National University (ANU) Physics Department, along with the author of the software, has used it for (amongst other things) the analysis of immiscible flow in massive 3D systems. Further uses were presented at the APAC '07.

Among other software, Drishti uses Qt for the GUI widgets and OpenGL Extension Wrangler Library (GLEW).

== Features ==
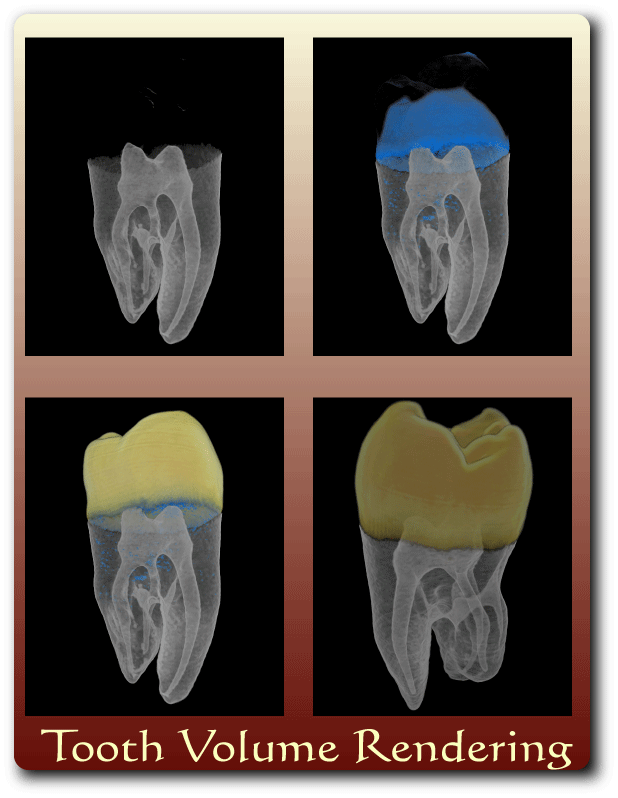
Volumetric view of a tooth in Drishti showing 2D transfer function capabilities

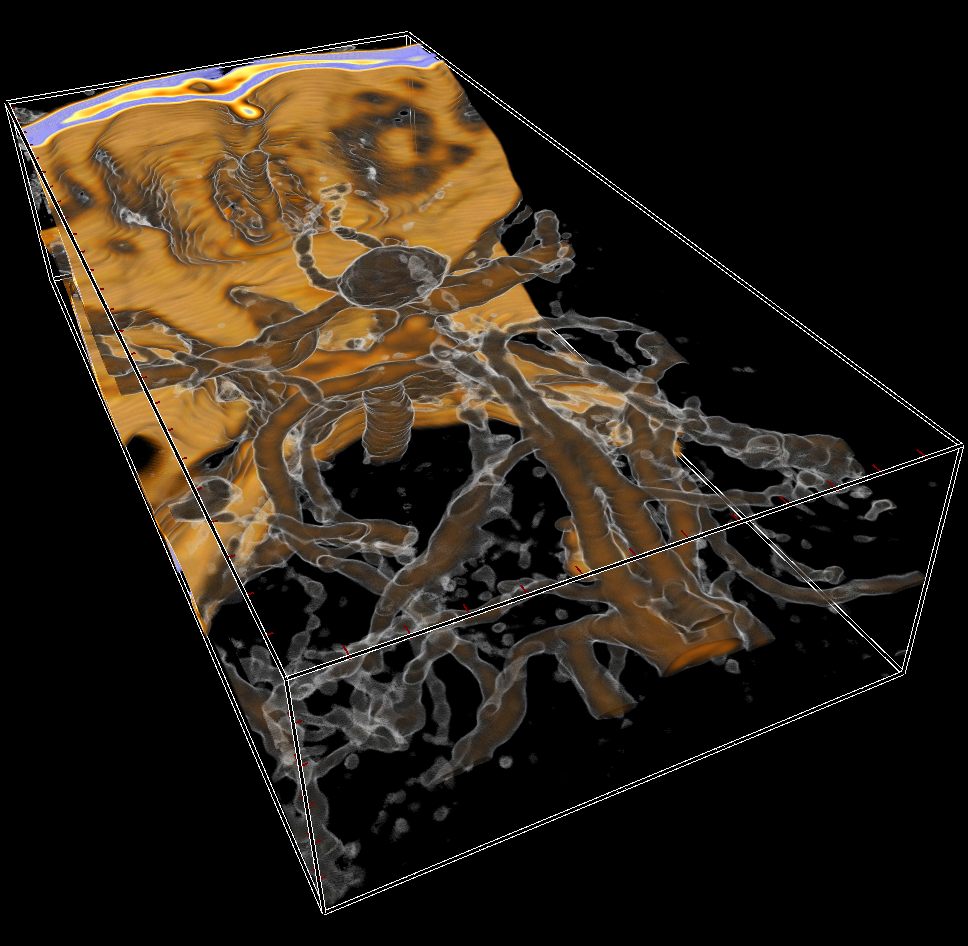
Volumetric view of an aneurysm in Drishti

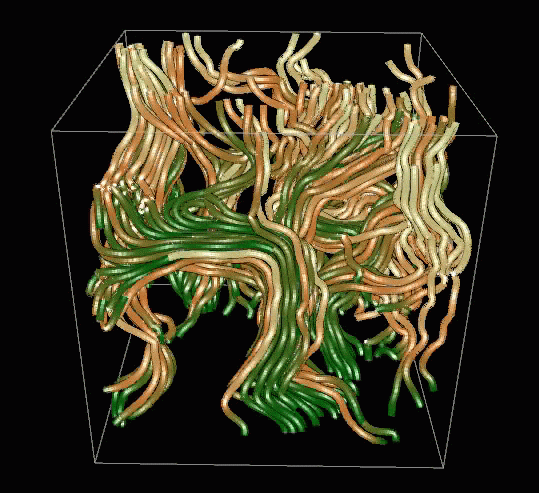
Streamlines in Drishti

Drishti provides a number of features that would otherwise require several proprietary volume visualisation programs or that are simply not available together in other software:

- volume rendering: drawing a scalar function defined over a volumetric region of space with some translucent appearance so that the interior of the dataset can be observed.
- 2D Transfer functions (or Lookup tables): In addition to, or instead of thresholding, Drishti allows the user to apply transfer functions across "density" or "value" as well as gradient.
- clipping: removing some spatial region from a dataset.
- Streamlines
- Masking
- Brick Animations
- Realtime animation and movie export with:
  - camera choreography (camera position, pan, rotation, zoom, etc.)
  - transfer-function choreography
  - time series choreography
  - sub-volume choreography
- Importing DICOM image stack in addition to the current raw and processed (netCDF) volume file formats.
- Tensor visualization using superellipsoids
- Network (Graph) visualization
- Remap facility for remapping 16/32 bit volumes to 8 bit volumes
- Cropping and scaling facility for image stacks
- Cropping and scaling facility for RAW volumes
- Saving movies from the program
