= DHIS2 =

Health management software platform

- Other names: DHIS
- Developer: HISP Centre at the University of Oslo
- Release: 1996
- Stable release: v42.1.0 / May 6, 2025; 18 months ago
- Written in: Java, JavaScript, PostgreSQL
- Operating system: Windows, Linux, macOS
- Type: Health management information system
- License: DHIS 1 (1.4): GPL; DHIS 2: BSD 3-Clause
- Website: www.dhis2.org

DHIS2 (also spelled DHIS 2, formerly District Health Information Software) is a free and open-source software platform for the collection, reporting, analysis and dissemination of aggregate and individual-level data. DHIS2 is used as a national-scale HMIS in more than 70 countries, covering key health data for over 40% of the world’s population.

The most common use of DHIS2 is for health data, where it can be implemented for individual health programs and/or as a national-scale Health Management Information System (HMIS). As of the end of 2022, DHIS2 was in use by Ministries of Health in more than 75 low- and middle-income countries (LMICs), with 69 countries using DHIS2 at national scale. Beyond health, DHIS2 is used in sectors such as education, supply chain and logistics, water and sanitation, nutrition and food security, agriculture and land management, and e-governance, among others. DHIS2 is officially recognized as a Digital Public Good.

Development of the core DHIS2 software is coordinated by the HISP Centre at the University of Oslo (formerly the Health Information Systems Programme), where it is housed within the Department of Informatics. The DHIS2 project is supported financially by a coalition of global partners, including Norad; PEPFAR; The Global Fund to Fight AIDS, Tuberculosis and Malaria; UNICEF; Gavi, the Vaccine Alliance; the U.S. Centers for Disease Control and Prevention; the Bill & Melinda Gates Foundation; and the University of Oslo. The HISP Centre is an official Collaborating Centre of the World Health Organization.

== DHIS2 software ==
As a digital solution for data collection and management, DHIS2 can be used for aggregate data (e.g. routine health facility data, staffing, equipment, infrastructure, population estimates, etc.), event data (e.g. disease outbreaks, survey/audit data, patient satisfaction surveys, etc.), and individual-level longitudinal data (e.g. vaccination records, lab sample collection and testing, patient treatment and follow-up, student progress, etc.). The system supports the capture of data linked to any level in an organizational hierarchy at any data collection frequency.

DHIS2 includes built-in tools for analytics, including dashboards, charts, pivot tables and maps, as well as data validation and data quality features. It also includes tools to support collaborative data use, such as sharing, commenting and interpretation. The DHIS2 platform can be extended with custom applications (which can be published and shared through the DHIS2 App Hub) or integrated with third-party software or external data sources through the open web API. DHIS2 supports health data standards such as FHIR, SNOMED GPS, LOINC, and ICD-11, as well as the generic ADX format for aggregate data exchange. The DHIS2 data model and platform are generic by design, not specifically tailored to the health context, to facilitate the application of DHIS2 to a variety of use cases.

DHIS2 is a web-based platform. The core software and database are hosted on a server, which can be either physically located in the country of ownership or cloud-based. Users can access the DHIS2 through any modern web browser. In addition, the DHIS2 Capture Android application can be used to collect and update DHIS2 data on mobile devices and tablets that use the Android operating system. When data is entered through the web or Android application, it is synced with the central DHIS2 server for that instance. Each individual instance of the DHIS2 software and the data it contains is locally owned and managed.

DHIS2 includes support for translation and localization, and has already been translated into a number of languages including French, Portuguese, Spanish, Hindi, Vietnamese, Chinese and Norwegian.

DHIS2 software development occurs in 12-month cycles of backend releases, plus periodic patch releases and continuous app releases. Development is coordinated by the HISP Centre according to a collaboratively planned, public roadmap that prioritizes generic improvements that meet country needs.

== Uses of DHIS2 ==
=== Health ===
DHIS2 is currently in use as a Health Management Information System in more than 75 low- and middle-income countries. 69 of these countries have deployed DHIS2 at national scale. DHIS2 is also used by national health authorities and international health programs and organizations for management of health programs related to specific diseases, such as HIV, TB, and Malaria, among others, as well as for general public health programs such as disease surveillance, routine immunization, and maternal and child health. In 2025, Bangladesh implemented an electronic health information system using the DHIS2 Tracker to manage and evaluate its national cervical screening program. In addition, during the COVID-19 pandemic, 55 countries rapidly deployed or extended DHIS2 for national pandemic response and/or vaccination.

=== Climate and Health ===
Beginning in 2024, the HISP Centre received a grant from the Wellcome Trust to develop and pilot new DHIS2 functionalities for climate and health use cases. This has led to the development of tools for integrating weather, climate, and environmental data into DHIS2 and harmonizing it with health data and for predictive modeling of climate-sensitive diseases.

=== Education ===
Since 2019, the HISP Centre has worked with six countries to pilot DHIS2 as an Education Management Information System (EMIS), with financial support from NORAD and GPE/KIX. This use case adapts the core DHIS2 functionality and data model to the education sector for such purposes as student and teacher records, school report cards, and resource allocation.

=== Logistics ===
DHIS2 is used for health logistics data in more than 20 countries in Africa and Asia, where it serves as a last-mile solution for facility-level data capture for health commodities. Most commonly, this involves regular reporting of aggregate data on stocks and usage of common medical supply items such as vaccines, medications, syringes, etc, which facilitates triangulation of health service and commodity data as well as forecasting. In addition, some countries use DHIS2 for vaccine cold chain or other electronic Logistics Management Information System (eLMIS) use cases.

=== Other uses ===
As a generic software platform, DHIS2 has been adapted for a variety of use cases both within and beyond the health sector. In addition to the most common uses listed above, examples of known DHIS2 projects include water and sanitation, nutrition and food security, agriculture and land management, and e-governance.

== History of DHIS development ==
The original District Health Information Software (DHIS) was developed for three health districts in Cape Town as part of the Health Information Systems Programme (HISP), a collaborative research project between the University of Oslo and the University of the Western Cape that began in 1994.

=== DHIS 1.3 and 1.4 ===
The DHIS version 1 series goes back to 1996 and was developed on the Microsoft Access platform consisting of VBA for the interface or program logic (front-end), Access as a database (back-end), Excel for reporting and Windows as the OS. DHIS 1.4 (from 2005) is a significant overhaul of the version 1.3 database structure, using various output formats for reporting. It bridges the gap between DHIS 1.3 and 2.

=== DHIS2 ===
DHIS version 2 (from 2004) is a continuation of DHIS version 1 developed on open source Java technologies and available as an online web application. The first release, version 2.0, came in February 2008 after three years of development releases, and the most recent version is 43.0.1 (as of June 2026). DHIS2 is developed using open-source Java frameworks and tools, such as the Spring Framework, Hibernate, Struts2, Maven, and JUnit.
