= IntraHealth International =

Nonprofit organization in Chapel Hill, North Carolina, USA

IntraHealth International is a non-profit organization based in Chapel Hill, North Carolina, U.S.A. dedicated to working with developing countries to improve their public health capabilities. Originally established as a program of the medical school of the University of North Carolina at Chapel Hill in 1979, IntraHealth became an independent non-governmental organization in 2003. The organization has worked in more than 50 countries, and is currently active in 28.

IntraHealth focuses on:

- Developing sustainable human resources for health
- Strengthening and supporting primary health care providers
- Preventing and treating HIV/AIDS, tuberculosis and malaria
- Improving maternal, neonatal and children's health
- Increasing access to family planning

== International Development ==
IntraHealth worked to increase community health services in Rwanda, with a $34 million grant from the U.S. Agency for International Development.

== Open Source ==
Since 2005, IntraHealth has focused some of its efforts on Health-related Open Source software and uses Canonical's Launchpad to organize their efforts.

Their primary software product is the iHRIS Suite — an open source solution for tracking and managing health care workers across a country. In February 2009, the iHRIS Suite was recognised as one of 50 health-related Open Source projects

Other open source work is the development of a dedicated appliance, integration of KnowledgeTree and Joomla for the Library at the Ministry of Health in Uganda.

On February 11, 2009, IntraHealth launched their IntraHealth Open campaign with Youssou N'Dour with the release of his song "Wake Up (It's Africa Calling)" under Creative Commons license. The campaign aims to bring open source health applications to Africa. The song was remixed by a variety of artists including Nas, Peter Buck of R.E.M., and Duncan Sheik to help raise money for the campaign.
