= List of freeware health software =

The following is a list of freeware software packages and applications for use in the health industry:

== Imaging ==
- BioDigital
- Ginkgo CADx, cross-platform open source DICOM viewer
- IrfanView, an image viewer for Windows with DICOM support
- MicroDicom, DICOM viewer for Windows
- VistA imaging, public domain fully integrated PACS, image, and scanned document information system. Incorporates proprietary modules not available outside the VA

== Practice management ==
- GaiaEHR
- GNUmed
- OpenEMR
- OpenMRS

== See also ==
- eHealth
- Health Informatics
- List of open-source bioinformatics software
