= Jñāna =

"Knowledge" in Indian philosophy and religion

In Indian philosophy and religions, jñāna (Sanskrit: ज्ञान, [ˈdʑɲaːnɐ]) is "knowledge, wisdom, comprehension". It gives irrefutable knowledge or understanding of an object, especially the supreme Being or reality.

== Etymology ==
In Sanskrit, Jñāna, also transliterated into English as jnana, jnan, gyana, gyan, or gyaan, is "knowledge, wisdom, comprehension". The root ज्ञा- jñā- is cognate to Slavic znati, English know, Greek γνώ- (as in γνῶσις gnosis), and Lithuanian žinoti.

Jñāna is a cognitive event which gives irrefutable knowledge or understanding of an object, especially the supreme Being or reality. Ajñāna (अज्ञान, "ignorance") is the antonym of jñāna.

== Jainism ==
According to the Jain texts like Tattvārthsūtra (śloka 1.9) and Sarvārthasiddhi, knowledge is of five kinds:

1. Mati Jñāna (Sensory Knowledge)
2. Śruta Jñāna (Scriptural Knowledge)
3. Avadhi Jñāna (Clairvoyance)
4. Manaḥ prayāya Jñāna (Telepathy)
5. Kevalā Jñāna (Omniscience)

== Buddhism ==
In Theravāda Buddhism there are various vipassana-ñānas or "insight knowledges" on the path of insight into the true nature of reality. As a person meditates these ñānas or "knowledges" will be experienced in order. The experience of each may be brief or may last for years and the subjective intensity of each is variable. Each ñāna could also be considered a jhāna although many are not stable and the mind has no way to remain embedded in the experience. Experiencing all the ñānas will lead to the first of the four stages of enlightenment, then the cycle will start over at a subtler level.

In Mahayana Buddhism, the term is used in a variety of contexts. Usually it refers to a superior spiritual knowledge that buddhas and bodhisattvas attain. When referring to the knowledge of a Buddha, Mahayana texts use the schema of the Five Wisdoms (pancajñāna).

In Tibetan Buddhism, jñāna (Tibetan: ye shes) refers to pure awareness that is free of conceptual encumbrances, and is contrasted with vijñāna, which is a moment of 'divided knowing'. Entrance to, and progression through the ten stages of jñāna (Bodhisattva bhūmis), will lead one to complete enlightenment (bodhi) and nirvana.

== Hinduism ==
=== Nyaya ===
In Nyaya, jñāna is a mental event, better translated as cognition rather than knowledge. Jñāna can be true or false. Jñāna is not belief, but lead to the formation of belief. All true cognitions reflect their object. However, true cognitions do not always arise from a source of knowledge. True cognitions can also arise accidentally. A key tenet of Nyaya epistemology is that all true cognitions reflect their object. A true cognition does not necessarily have to arise from a valid source of knowledge (pramana); it can also occur accidentally.

=== Yoga ===
Jñāna yoga (ज्ञानयोग, lit. Yoga of Knowledge) is one of the three main paths (मार्ग, margas), which are supposed to lead towards moksha (मोक्ष) or liberation from material existence. The other two main paths are Karma yoga (the path of action) and Bhakti yoga(the path of devotion). The fourth path, Rāja yoga (राजयोग, classical yoga) which integrates several yogic practices, is also said to lead to the moksha. These paths are traditionally understood by different temperaments or personality types: Jnan yoga for the philosophically inclined, Bhakti yoga for the emotionally inclined, and Karma yoga for actively inclined.

=== Vedanta ===
In Vedanta, Jnana refers to "salvific knowledge", or knowledge that leads to liberation (moksha). The Upanishads, which form the concluding part of the Vedas, are regarded as the repository of this spiritual knowledge, and are thus referred to as the jnanakanda. This concept is encapsulated in the Mahāvākya (great saying) as Prajñānam Brahma (प्रज्ञानं ब्रह्म), one of the Mahāvākyas, which is loosely translated to "Insight is Brahman" or "Brahman is Insight".

== Sikhism ==
The word gyan (which comes from the Sanskrit jñāna) means spiritual wisdom or true understanding. Sikh teachings explains that this kind of wisdom must come before meditation or deep contemplation. Without first gaining gyan, a person cannot truly practice dhian (focused meditation). The Guru Granth Sahib makes this point clear by stating that those who have not internalized the Guru's message lack both spiritual wisdom and the ability to contemplate, and at the end cannot truly love the Divine within.Learned people are often referred to as "Giani". It is mentioned throughout the Guru Granth Sahib.

The Guru Granth Sahib describes a brahm giāni is one who has attained the highest spiritual knowledge as someone whose mind and lips are always focused on the true one, who sees only the divine everywhere. Such a person lives in the world but remains untouched by it, like a lotus flower that grows in water but stays dry on its surface.

== See also ==
- Advaita Vedanta
- gnosis, a similar term in Western philosophy
- mysticism
- noesis (disambiguation), a similar term in Western philosophy & psychology
- nondualism
- vidya (philosophy)
- qualia, a partly-related term in Western philosophy

== Sources ==
- Apte, Vaman Shivram (1965). The Practical Sanskrit Dictionary. Delhi: Motilal Banarsidass Publishers. ISBN 81-208-0567-4.
- Britannica editors. "jnana (Indian religion)". Britannica Online Encyclopedia.
- Grimes, John (1996). A Concise Dictionary of Indian Philosophy. State University of New York Press.
- Olivelle, Patrick (1998). The early Upaniṣads: annotated text and translation. South Asia research. New York Oxford: Oxford University Press. ISBN 978-0-19-512435-4.
- Phillips, Stephen H. (2012). Epistemology in classical India: the knowledge sources of the Nyāya school. New York: Routledge. p. 5. ISBN 978-0-415-89554-5.
- Sahu, Bhagirathi (2004), The New Educational Philosophy, Sarup & Sons
