= Foundational Model of Anatomy =

Ontology for the domain of human anatomy

The Foundational Model of Anatomy Ontology (FMA) is a reference ontology for the domain of human anatomy. It is a symbolic representation of the canonical, phenotypic structure of an organism; a spatial-structural ontology of anatomical entities and relations which form the physical organization of an organism at all salient levels of granularity.

FMA is developed and maintained by the Structural Informatics Group at the University of Washington.

== Description ==
FMA ontology contains approximately 75,000 classes and over 120,000 terms, over 2.1 million relationship instances from over 168 relationship types.

== See also ==
- Terminologia Anatomica
- Anatomography
