= DVTk =

DVTk is an open-source project for testing, validating and diagnosing communication protocols and scenarios in medical environments. It supports DICOM, HL7 and IHE integration profiles.

== History ==
The history of DVTk goes back to 1997. Within the ARC group (Architecture Re-use and Communications) of Philips, the first version of the Validation Test Suite (VTS) was developed. This was a DICOM Validation tool with a command line interface. Based on this, later on, the ADVT (Agfa DICOM Validation Tool) was created. This was the first tool with a graphical user interface that made DICOM validation more pleasant.

Because Philips and Agfa wanted to join forces, in 2001 their cooperation became a fact and the first version of DVT (1.2) was born in 2002.

After major redesign and improvements, DVT 2.1 was released in June 2005. This version was the transition of the application from the Philips-AGFA cooperation project to the open-source community.

In 2006, ICT Automatisering joined the DVTk open-source project as the third participating company next to Philips and Agfa.

In 2007, DVTk started participating in the IHE Gazelle project by supplying an External Validation Service (DICOM Validation Web Service).

In 2008, Services for the DVTk open-source project was introduced.

== DVTk based DICOM application ==
- DICOM Anonymizer
- DICOM Compare
- DICOM Editor
- DICOM Network Analyzer
- DICOM Viewer and Validator
- DVT
- Modality Emulator
- Query Retrieve SCP Emulator
- RIS Emulator
- Storage SCP Emulator
- Storage SCU Emulator
