= Weasis =

Medical imaging software

An Open-Source DICOM Viewer

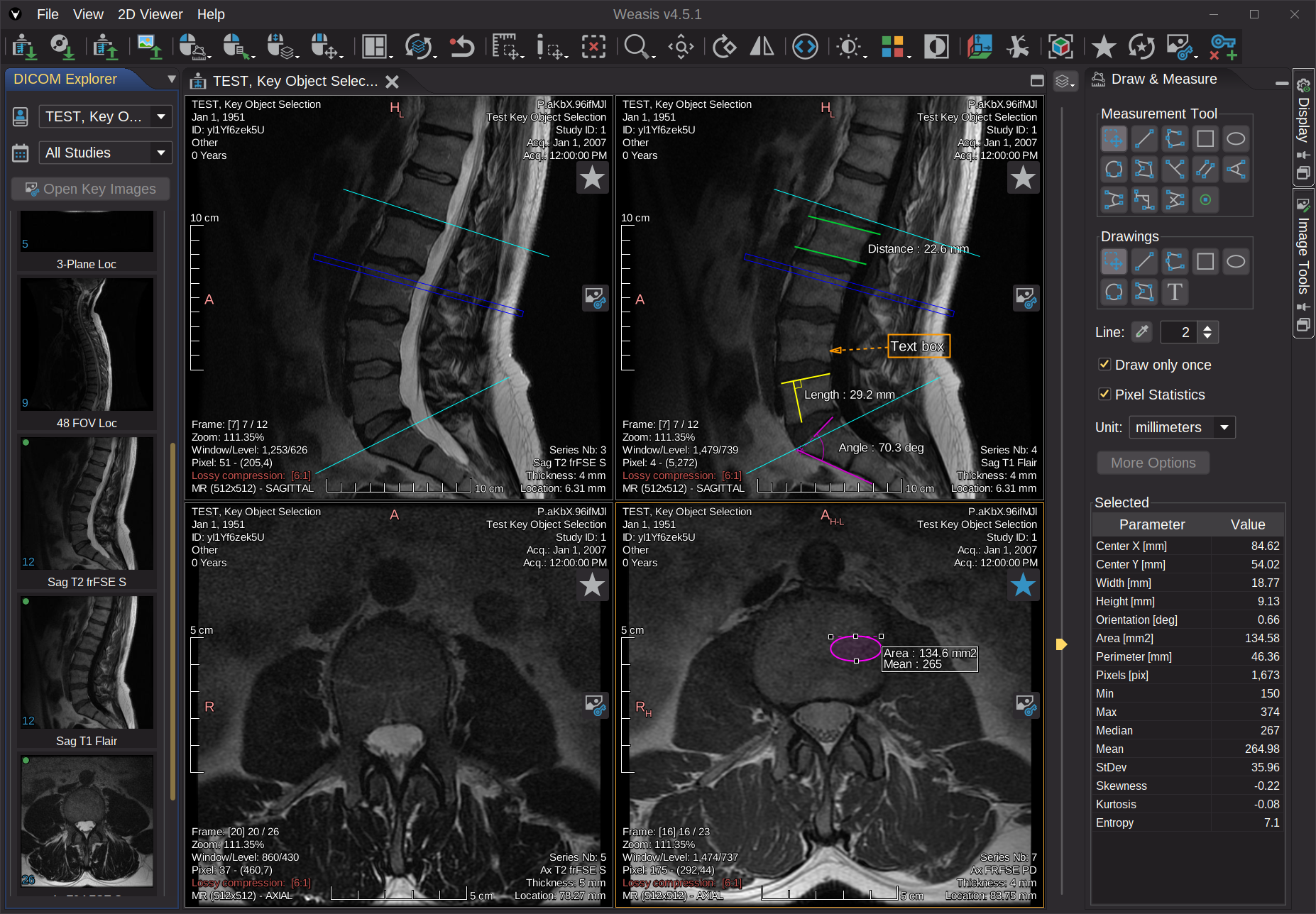
- Original author: Nicolas Roduit
- Developer: Weasis Teams
- Release: 4 November 2010; 15 years ago
- Stable release: v4.7.3 / 25 August 2026; 2 months ago
- Written in: Java
- Operating system: Windows, Linux, macOS
- Available in: 23 languages
- List of languages Bosnian (Bosnia and Herzegovina), Bulgarian (Bulgaria), Chinese (China), Chinese (Taiwan), Chinese Simplified, Croatian (Croatia), Czech, French, English, German, Greek, Italian, Japanese, Polish (Poland), Portuguese, Portuguese (Brazil), Romanian, Russian (Russia), Serbian (Serbia), Spanish, Turkish, Vietnamese, Vietnamese (Viet Nam)
- Type: Medical Imaging, DICOM
- Website: https://weasis.org
- Repository: github.com/nroduit/Weasis

Weasis is an open source DICOM viewing software for the visualization and analysis of medical images.

DICOM (Digital Imaging and Communications in Medicine) is the standard used to store and transmit medical imaging information. Weasis allows healthcare professionals to view and analyze these images for clinical purposes. It integrates with healthcare systems such as picture archiving and communication systems, radiological information systems, and electronic health records.

Weasis has been used for medical imaging, collaborative research, and radiology education.

== Development history ==
Weasis was originally developed in 2008 as part of the medical imaging software ecosystem at Geneva University Hospitals (HUG). In 2009, it was presented as a web-based image viewer compliant with the Web Access to DICOM Objects (WADO) standard at the Radiological Society of North America annual meeting. The project aimed to establish a vendor-neutral DICOM viewer suitable for diverse healthcare contexts.

After becoming open-source in 2010, Weasis has evolved through HUG and community contributions. It has been implemented for PACS solutions for emerging countries, quantitative imaging analysis, and touchless control using Leap Motion and Kinect devices.

== Software ==
Weasis supports DICOM communication with image archive systems, including sending (DICOM Send and STOW-RS) and retrieving (C-GET, C-MOVE and DICOMweb). It also implements the Invoke Image Display profile, defined as part of the IHE Radiology Technical Framework. For portability, it can be included on CDs, DVDs, or USB drives for offline use in different medical contexts.

Weasis supports a range of DICOM file types, including multi-frame and enhanced formats. It integrates tools for fundamental image manipulation, including panning, zooming, rotation, window level adjustment, filtering, and navigation through image series. Furthermore, it provides functionalities for linear, area and angular measurements on medical images.

For advanced image rendering, Weasis incorporates multiplanar reconstruction of CT scans to generate reformatted planar views in any desired orientation, and maximum intensity projection to enhance the visualization of structures with high attenuation values. Additionally, volume rendering capabilities enable three-dimensional visualization.

== Licensing ==
Weasis is released under the Eclipse Public License 2.0 or Apache 2.0, which allows modification and distribution. The software is compatible with Windows, macOS, and Linux. Installation packages and documentation are made available on the official website.
