= OsiriX =

Medical imaging software

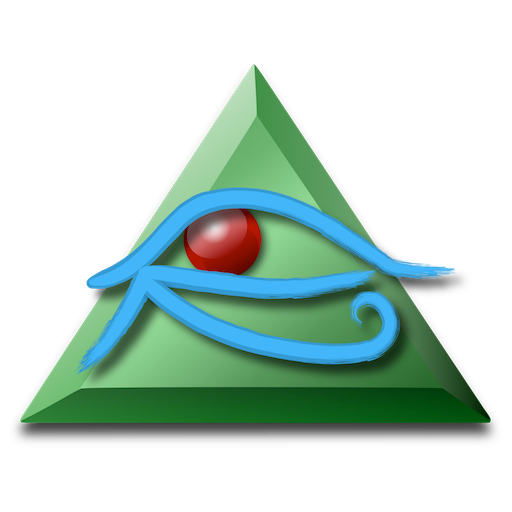
- Release: 2004; 22 years ago
- Stable release: 14.1 / October 12, 2024; 23 months ago
- Operating system: macOS (Commercial software), iOS (commercial software)
- Type: medical imaging software (DICOM)
- License: GNU LGPL, Proprietary (since 2010)
- Website: www.osirix-viewer.com

OsiriX is an image processing application for the Apple MacOS operating system dedicated to DICOM images (".dcm" / ".DCM" extension) produced by equipment (MRI, CT, PET, PET-CT, ...). OsiriX is complementary to existing viewers, in particular to nuclear medicine viewers. It can also read many other file formats: TIFF (8,16, 32 bits), JPEG, PDF, AVI, MPEG and QuickTime. It is fully compliant with the DICOM standard for image communication and image file formats. OsiriX is able to receive images transferred by DICOM communication protocol from any PACS or medical imaging modality (STORE SCP – Service Class Provider, STORE SCU – Service Class User, and Query/Retrieve).

Since 2010, a commercial version of OsiriX, named "OsiriX MD", is available. Its original source code is still available on GitHub. A demo version, "OsiriX Lite", still remains available free of charge with some limitations.

== History ==
The OsiriX project started in 2004 at UCLA with Dr Antoine Rosset and Prof. Osman Ratib. OsiriX has been developed by Rosset, working in LaTour Hospital (Geneva, Switzerland) and Joris Heuberger, a computer scientist from Geneva.

In 2010, a version of OsiriX for iPhone and iPod touch was released.

=== Versions ===
OsiriX 6.5 – 3D ROIs are introduced

OsiriX 7.0 – Several reporting plugins are included: PI-RADS, BI-RADS, Coronary Angiography, TAVI and Liver report plugins

OsiriX 7.5 – Dark Mode and vessel tracking (centreline)

OsiriX 8.5 – DICOMweb protocol support

OsiriX 9.0 – Smart Display (adjust image scaling to image content)

OsiriX 9.5 – JavaScript web viewer for the built-in Web Portal functionality

OsiriX 12.0 – Compiled for Apple Silicon processors (M1, M2, ...)

OsiriX 13.0 – DICOM fields editing directly in the database window

OsiriX 14.1 – Support for macOS 15

== Features ==
OsiriX has been specifically designed for navigation and visualization of multimodality and multidimensional images: 2D Viewer, 3D Viewer, 4D Viewer (3D series with temporal dimension, for example: Cardiac-CT) and 5D Viewer (3D series with temporal and functional dimensions, for example: Cardiac-PET-CT). The 3D Viewer offers all modern rendering modes: Multiplanar reconstruction (MPR), Surface Rendering, Volume Rendering and Maximum intensity projection (MIP). All these modes support 4D data and are able to produce image fusion between two different series (for example: PET-CT).

OsiriX is simultaneously a DICOM PACS workstation for imaging and an image processing software package for research (radiology and nuclear imaging), functional imaging, 3D imaging, confocal microscopy and molecular imaging.

OsiriX supports a complete plug-in architecture that allows one to expand the capabilities of OsiriX for personal needs. OsiriX is released under a proprietary license and runs under macOS.

OsiriX source code makes heavy use of Apple idioms such as Cocoa. The source is almost entirely in Objective-C.

== Pixmeo company ==
In 2010, the OsiriX Team created the company Pixmeo to promote and distribute a special limited version of OsiriX called OsiriX MD. Unlike the regular version, this version is certified for medical imaging. OsiriX MD is a FDA cleared 510k class II medical device, according to US Food And Drug Regulation CFR21 part 820. OsiriX MD complies with European Directive 93/42/EEC concerning medical devices. Under this directive, it is regarded as a class IIa.
