= Noesis =

In philosophy, noesis is the activity of the intellect or nous. Noetic is the corresponding adjective.

Noesis may also refer to:

== Philosophy ==
- Noesis (phenomenology), technical term in the Brentano–Husserl "philosophy of intentionality" tradition
- Noesis (Platonism), highest level in the analogy of the divided line discussed by Socrates and Glaucon, transcribed by Plato in Plato's Republic
- Noetics, a fringe branch of parapsychology concerned with the study of mind

== Music ==
- Noesis, a 2001–2003 composition by Hanspeter Kyburz
- Noesis, a 2005 concerto by Erkki-Sven Tüür
- "Noesis", a 2005 song by Gackt from Diabolos
- Noesis, American rapper who fronts the group Philadelphia Slick

== Other uses ==
- Noesis (online journal), a search engine and open-access journal for academic philosophy
- Noesis (software), for viewing, converting, and reverse engineering data.
- Noesis Cultural Society, a Romanian cultural organization
- Thessaloniki Science Center and Technology Museum or NOESIS

== See also ==
- Noema – Term in phenomenology
- Nous – Concept in classical philosophy
