= Ginkgo CADx =

Medical imaging software and DICOM viewer

- Ginkgo CADx displaying a CT
- Original author: MetaEmotion S.L
- Final release: 3.8.8 / January 12, 2019; 7 years ago
- Written in: C++
- Operating system: Windows, macOS, Linux
- Type: Scientific visualization and image computing
- License: LGPL
- Website: ginkgo-cadx.com at the Wayback Machine (archived 2018-03-31)

Ginkgo CADx is a discontinued multi-platform (Windows, Linux, Mac OS X) DICOM viewer (*.dcm) and dicomizer (convert different files to DICOM). Ginkgo CADx is licensed under LGPL license, being an open source project with an open core approach. The goal of Ginkgo CADx project was to develop an open source professional DICOM workstation.

Ginkgo CADx also had a professional version with a private license model called Ginkgo CADx Pro.

== About Ginkgo CADx ==
The main features of this software are:

- Fully functional DICOM viewer and DICOM workstation with PACS support (C-FIND, C-GET, C-MOVE, C-STORE...).
- Dicomizator: Ginkgo CADx can convert from JPEG, PNG, GIF, TIFF images and PDF documents to DICOM files.
- Cross-platform (Windows, Linux, Mac OS X).
- Standard DICOM tools: rulers, angle, window level, cinema mode...
- Supports numerous DICOM modalities as CT, MR, ECG, PET, XC, SC, XA, MG...
- Intuitive graphical interface customizable with user profiles.
- Easily integrated with third-party systems using HL7 messages, DICOM and IHE compliant workflows.

Ginkgo CADx is written in C++, has a plug-in architecture, and is cross-platform by way of CMake. It is also based on common open source libraries like VTK, ITK, and wxWidgets.

== History ==
Ginkgo CADx project started in 2009 with the aim to create an interactive, universal, homogeneous, open-source and cross-platform CADx environment. Developed by MetaEmotion, the first public version (2.0.2.0) of Ginkgo CADx was released in 2010.

The Ginkgo CADx team have collaborated with:

- Sacyl Public healthcare system of Castilla y León.
- GNUmed team. Packaging and compiling Ginkgo CADx for Ubuntu, Debian, Fedora and SUSE.
