= DICOMweb =

Web development standard in the medical technology industry

- Developer: National Electrical Manufacturers Association (DICOM Standards Committee)
- Initial release: 2010s
- Standard: DICOM PS3.18
- Type: Medical imaging; Health informatics; Web service

DICOMweb is a term applied to the family of RESTful DICOM services defined for sending, retrieving and querying for medical images and related information.

The intent is to provide a light-weight mobile device and web browser friendly mechanism for accessing images, which can be implemented by developers who have minimal familiarity with the DICOM standard and which uses consumer application friendly mechanisms like http, JSON and media types (like "image/jpeg") to the maximum extent possible.

The standard is formally defined in DICOM PS3.18 Web Services.

The DICOMweb services are distinguished from other DICOM web services by the suffix "-RS", indicating their RESTful nature.

The family consists primarily of:

- WADO-RS for retrieval of DICOM PS3.10 files, metadata in XML or JSON forms, bulk data separated from the metadata and rendered consumer format images
- STOW-RS for storage (sending) of DICOM PS3.10 files or separated metadata and bulk data
- QIDO-RS for querying collections (databases, registries) of DICOM objects

A key feature of the WADO-RS services is the ability to retrieve entire studies and series rather than needing repeated request for individual instances.

Other services including support for work lists (UPS-RS) and retrieval of server capabilities.

== Examples ==
Some very simple examples of URL syntax and metadata encoding are described in the DICOMweb Cheatsheet.

== Comparison with Conventional DICOM services ==
Roughly speaking, the DICOMweb services can be compared with the conventional DIMSE DICOM services as follows:

DICOMweb	DIMSE
WADO-RS	C-GET
STOW-RS	C-STORE
QIDO-RS	C-FIND

Indeed, apart from the different encoding of the request, packaging of the response and protocol used, the services are sufficiently similar that a DICOMweb proxy to a conventional implementation of DICOM DIMSE services can be implemented (this is by design). The conventional DIMSE DICOM services do actually have capabilities that correspond to the instance and frame level (Instance and Frame Level Retrieve) and separate metadata retrieval capabilities (Composite Instance Retrieve Without Bulk Data) of DICOMweb, though these are not nearly as widely implemented as the traditional study-root study, series and image retrieval services.

== History ==
Earlier DICOM web services used either URL parameters (WADO-URI) or SOAP-based web services (WADO-WS) to retrieve DICOM objects.

The original Web Access to DICOM Persistent Objects (WADO) standard was a joint effort by DICOM and an ISO working group and was released in 2003 as DICOM Supplement 85 and ISO 17432. The word "persistent" in the name was later dropped. The ISO standard has not been maintained as DICOM PS3.18 has evolved over time. The suffix "-URI" was later added to distinguish what is now called WADO-URI from the newer services. WADO-URI became popular for providing access to both original DICOM files and server side rendered versions of them, and accordingly was included in the IHE XDS-I.b profile as one of its required transport mechanisms.

After IHE had gone through several revisions of the XDS-I profile, it defined a SOAP-based mechanism for transferring images (the RAD-69 transaction), and this was added to DICOM retrospectively, extended, and became WADO-WS, which was subsequently retired since it was incomplete and not being maintained.

As part of DICOM Supplement 118 - Application Hosting, finalized in 2010, an XML "native DICOM model" was introduced that defined bi-directional transcoding of DICOM datasets between the conventional binary representation and an XML representation.

An independent group of developers defined an alternative transport mechanism, Medical Imaging Network Transport (MINT), and proposed it as an extension to DICOM. Though MINT was not adopted in its entirety, the developers were assimilated by DICOM WG 27, and several key features of MINT were defined as extensions to DICOM PS3.18.

== Implementations ==
=== Server ===
- DCM4CHEE Archive
- Orthanc
- Medical Connections
- OsiriX 8.5 or higher

=== Client ===
- OHIF Viewer
- OsiriX Viewer 8.5 or higher
- Orthanc
- Weasis
