= GaiaEHR =

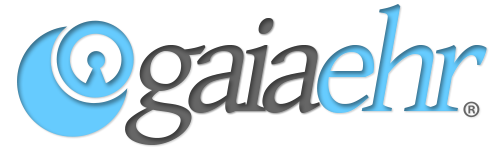
- Final release: v0.0.7 / March 2014; 12 years ago
- Operating system: Linux, Unix-like, macOS, Windows
- Type: Medical practice management software, Electronic Medical Records
- License: GNU General Public License
- Website: web.archive.org/web/20160304075419/http://gaiaehr.org/
- Repository: github.com/gaiaehr/gaiaehr

GaiaEHR is free and open-source medical practice management and electronic health record software.

== Technologies ==
The software suite is written as a web application and includes both server and client. The server is written in PHP and can be employed in conjunction with a LAMP "stack", though other operating systems are supported as well. The client side does not employ a common web browser, but some own software based on the Ext JS JavaScript application framework.

GaiaEHR is free and open-source software subject to the terms of the GNU General Public License (GPL).

== History ==
The GaiaEHR project originally forked from OpenEMR in September 2009 as MitosEHR but after a few years the project and repository were renamed to GaiaEHR. Active development seems to have stopped in 2016.

== Screenshots ==
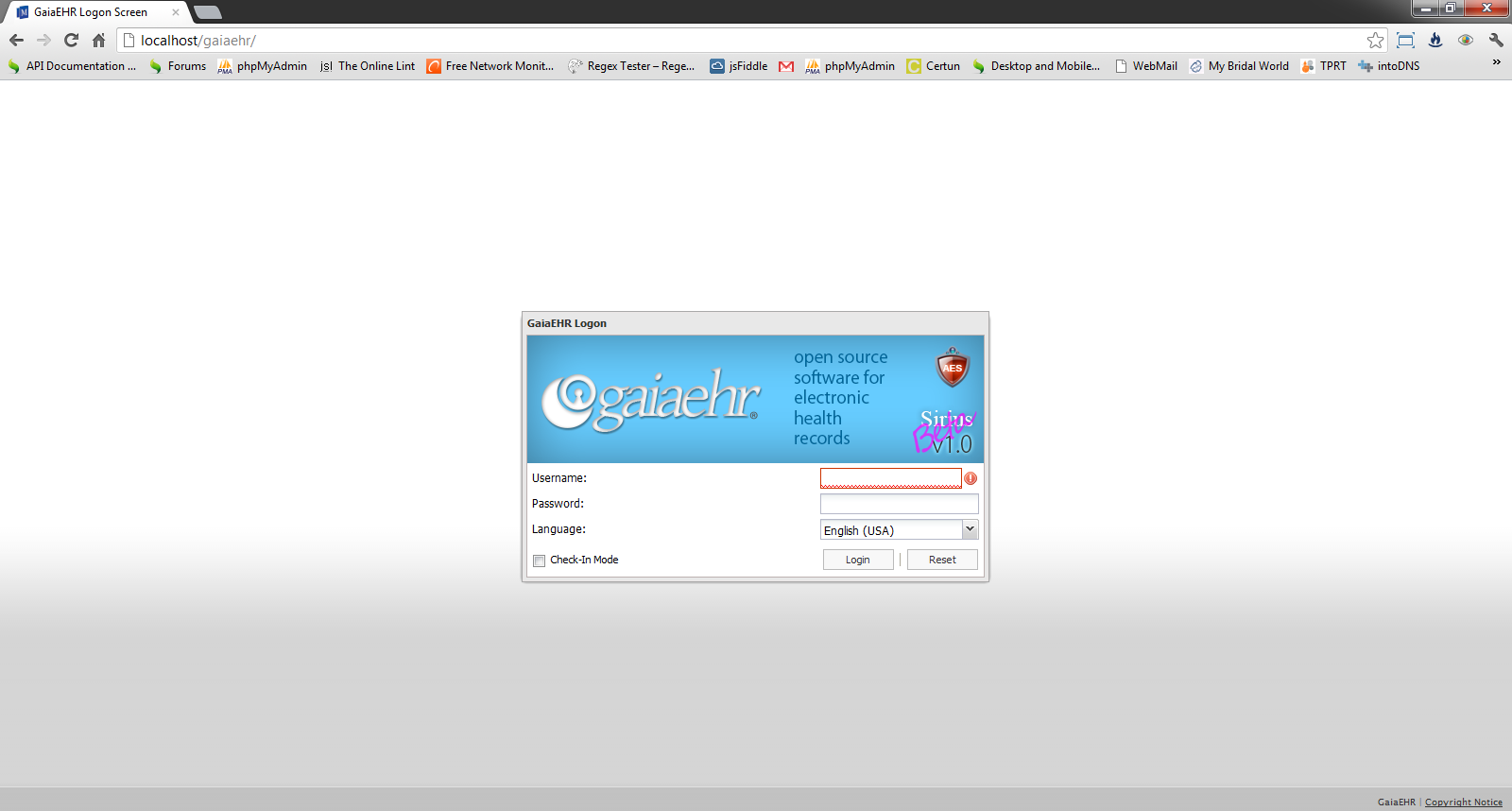
Login

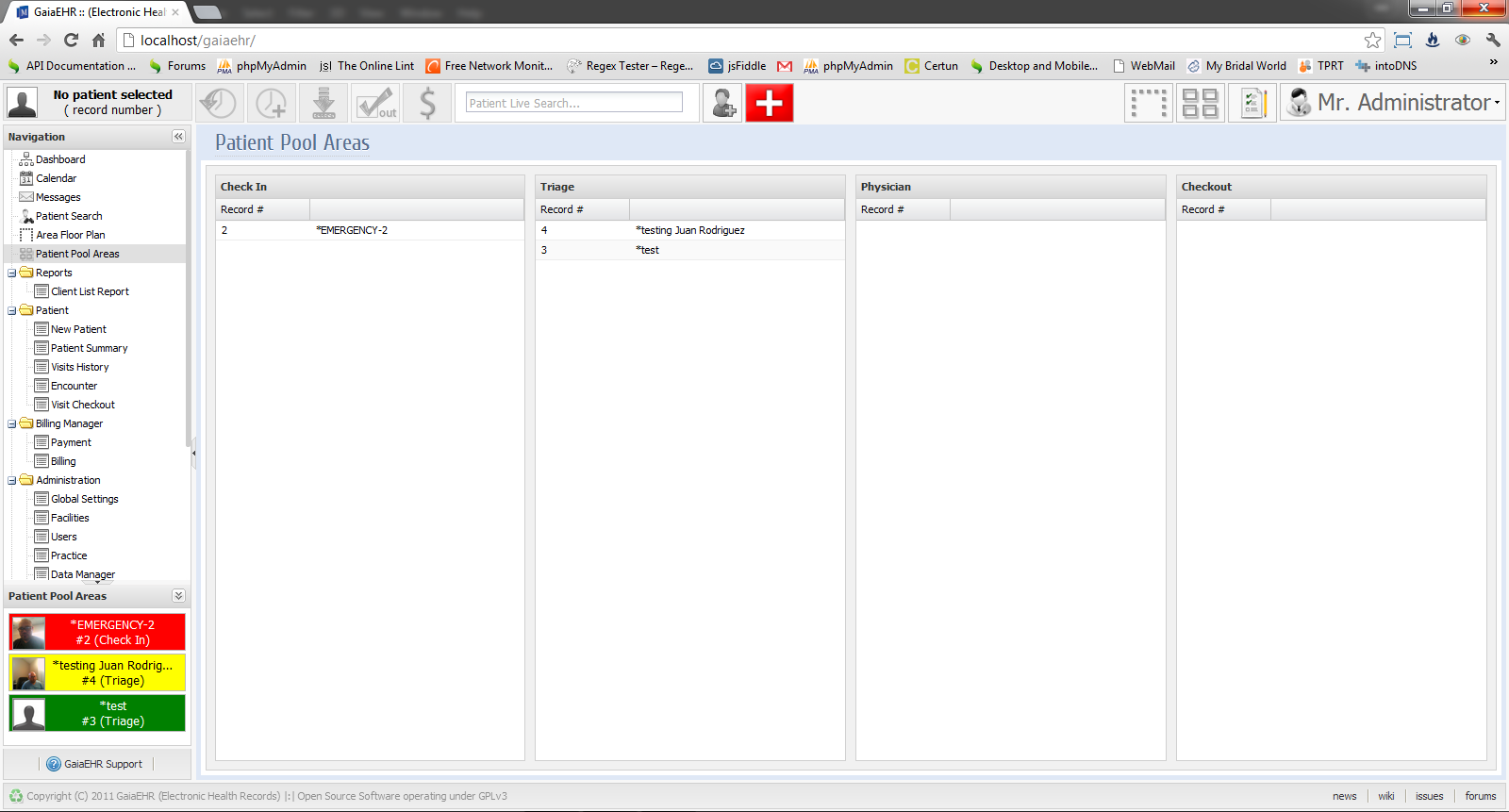
Pool Areas

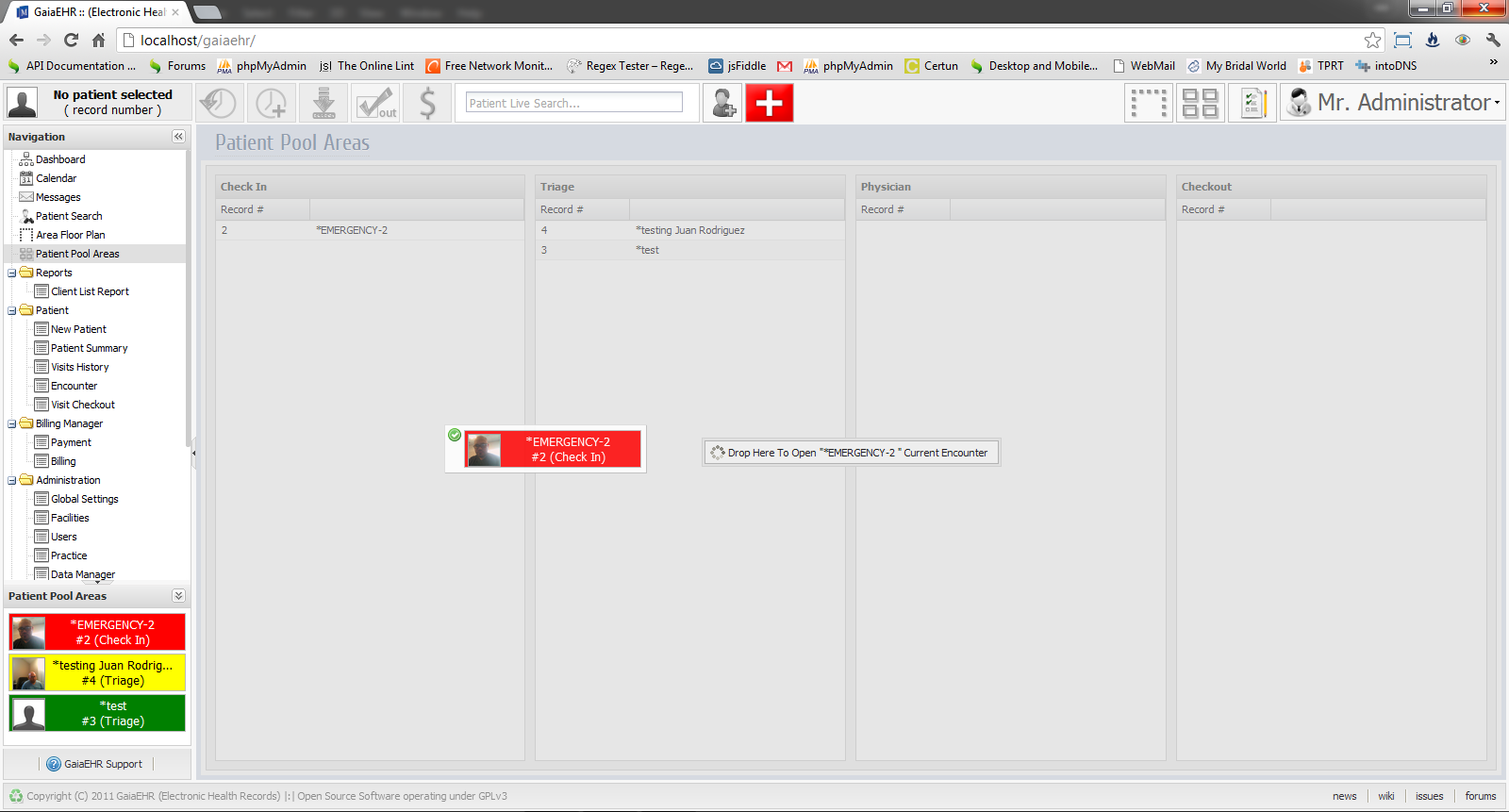
Drag and Drop

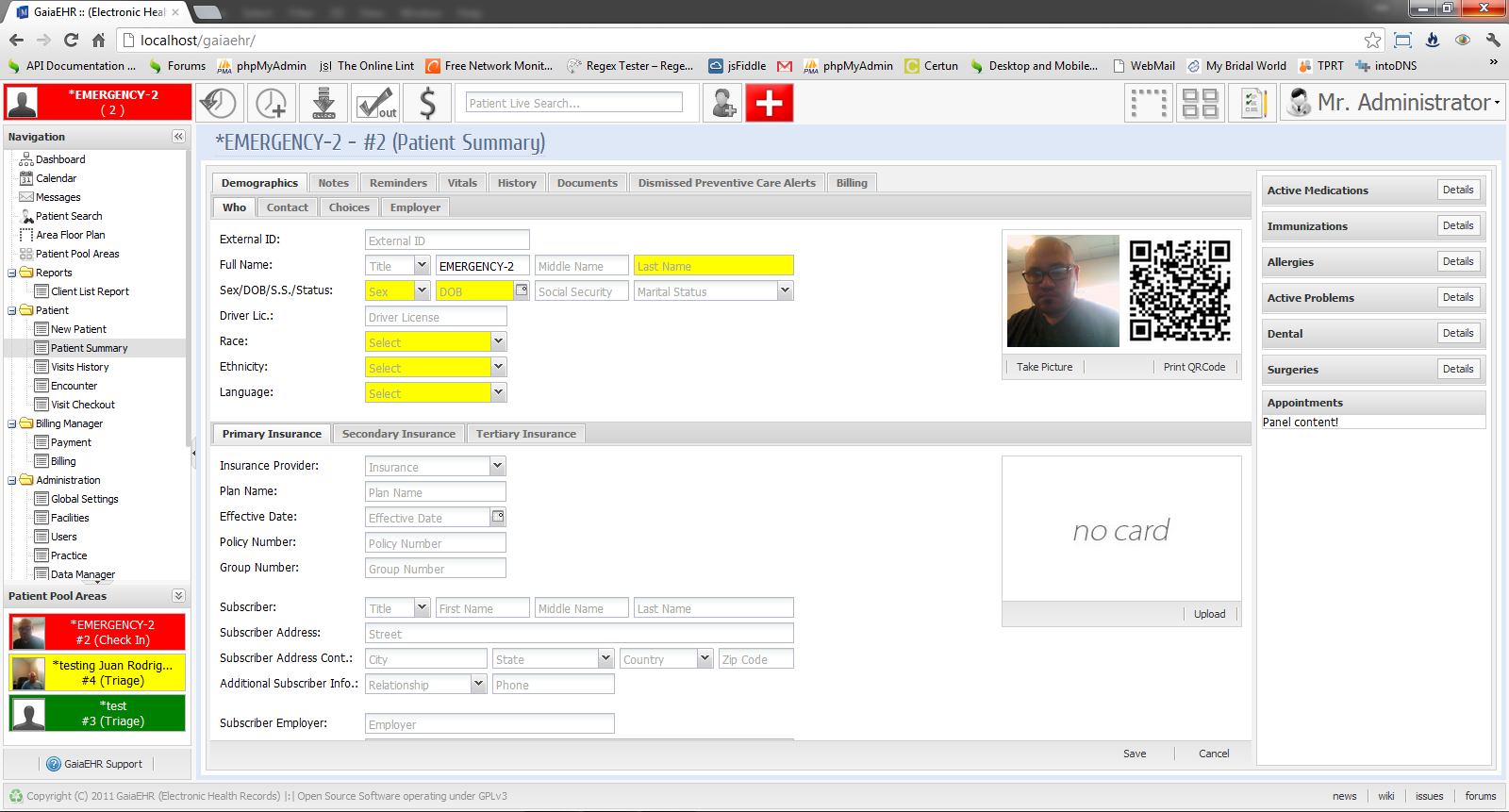
Patient Summary Panel

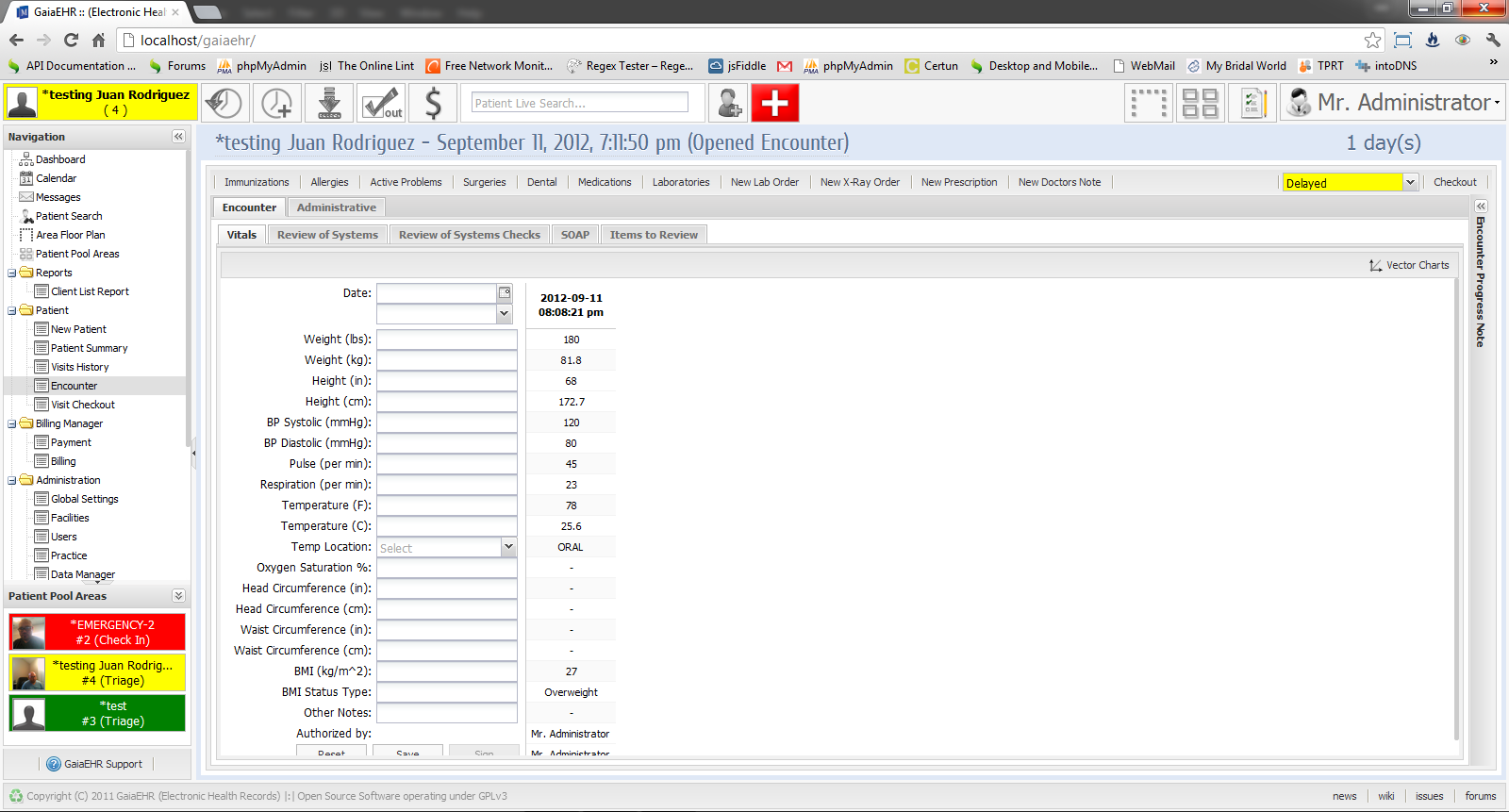
Encounter Panel
