= InVesalius =

Medical imaging software

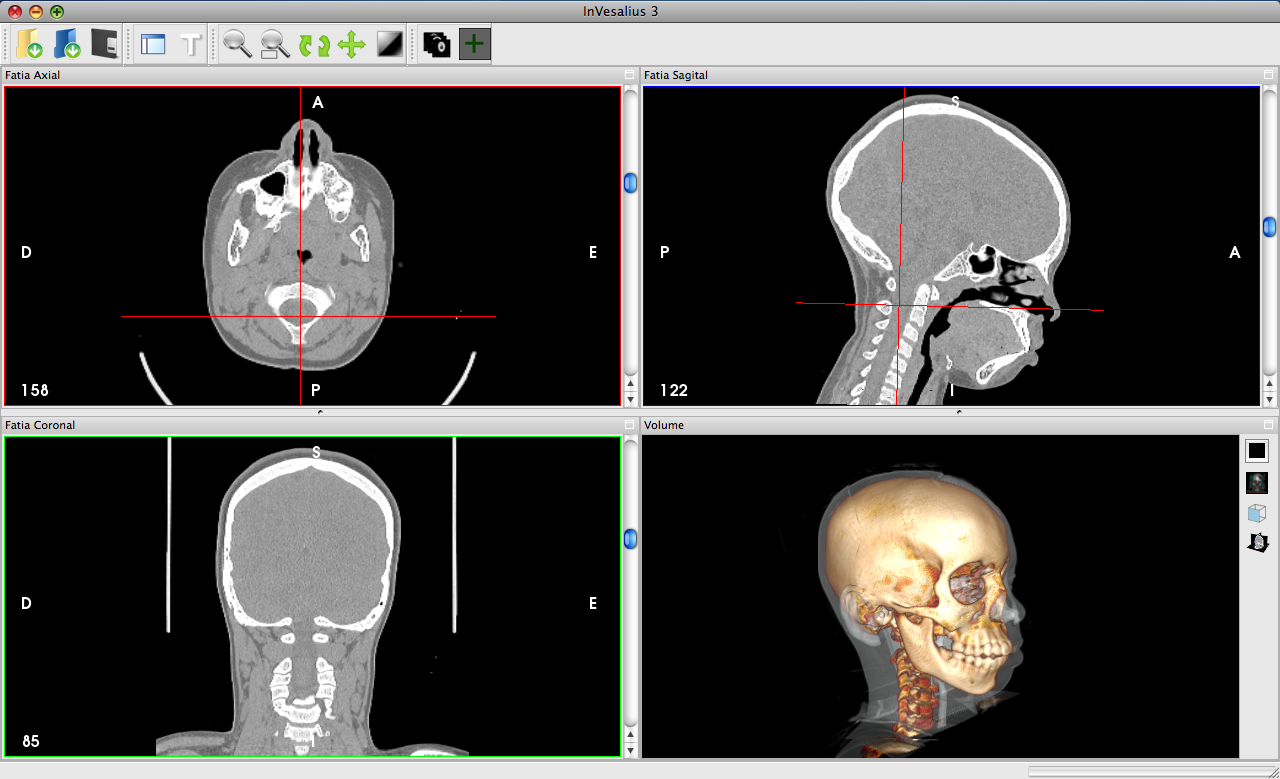
- Developer: CTI
- Stable release: 3.1.1 / 18 August 2017; 9 years ago
- Written in: Python
- Operating system: Linux, Windows, Mac OS X
- Available in: English, Japanese, Czech, Portuguese (Brazil), Russian, Spanish, Italian, German, Portuguese, Turkish (Turkey), Romanian, French, Korean, Catalan, Chinese (Taiwan), Greek
- Type: Medical software
- License: GNU GPL2
- Website: https://www.cti.gov.br/invesalius/
- Repository: github.com/invesalius/

InVesalius is a free medical software used to generate virtual reconstructions of structures in the human body. Based on two-dimensional images, acquired using computed tomography or magnetic resonance imaging equipment, the software generates virtual three-dimensional models correspondent to anatomical parts of the human body. After constructing three-dimensional DICOM images, the software allows the generation of STL (stereolithography) files. These files can be used for rapid prototyping.

InVesalius was developed at CTI (Renato Archer Information Technology Center), a research institute of the Brazilian Science and Technology Center and is available at no cost at the homepage of Public Software Portal homepage. The software license is CC-GPL 2. It is available in English, Japanese, Czech, Portuguese (Brazil), Russian, Spanish, Italian, German, Portuguese, Turkish (Turkey), Romanian, French, Korean, Catalan, Chinese (Taiwan) and Greek.

InVesalius was developed using Python and works under Linux, Windows and Mac OS X. It also uses graphic libraries VTK, wxPython, Numpy, Scipy and GDCM.

The software's name is a tribute to Belgian physician Andreas Vesalius (1514–1564), considered the "father of modern anatomy". Developed since 2001 for attending Brazilian Public Hospitals demands, InVesalius development was directed for promoting social inclusion of individuals with severe facial deformities. Since then, however, it has been employed in various research areas of dentistry, medicine, veterinary medicine, paleontology and anthropology. It has been used not only in public hospitals, but also in private clinics and hospitals.

Until 2017, the software had already been used for generating more than 5000 rapid prototyping models of anatomical structures at Promed project.

== Related works ==
- Confex.com (in English)
- Studierfenster
