= MicroDicom =

MicroDicom DICOM viewer
- Original author: Simeon Antonov Stoykov
- Developer: MicroDicom Ltd.
- Release: 2006 (20 years ago)
- Stable release: 2026.4 / 3 November 2026 (0 days ago)
- Operating system: Windows
- Platform: x86; x86-64
- Type: medical imaging software (DICOM)
- License: Proprietary
- Website: www.microdicom.com

MicroDicom is a free DICOM viewer and editor for Windows. It can open DICOM images produced by medical equipment (MRI, PET, CT, ...). It can also possible to open other image formats – BMP, GIF, JPEG, PNG, TIFF, etc. It has also been used by the U.S. Department of Veterans' Affairs to get medical data on their state of health.

== See also ==
- Electronic health record
- Electronic Medical Record
- Medical imaging
- Medical software
- Picture Archiving and Communication System (PACS)
