= Noesis (software) =

3D graphics software

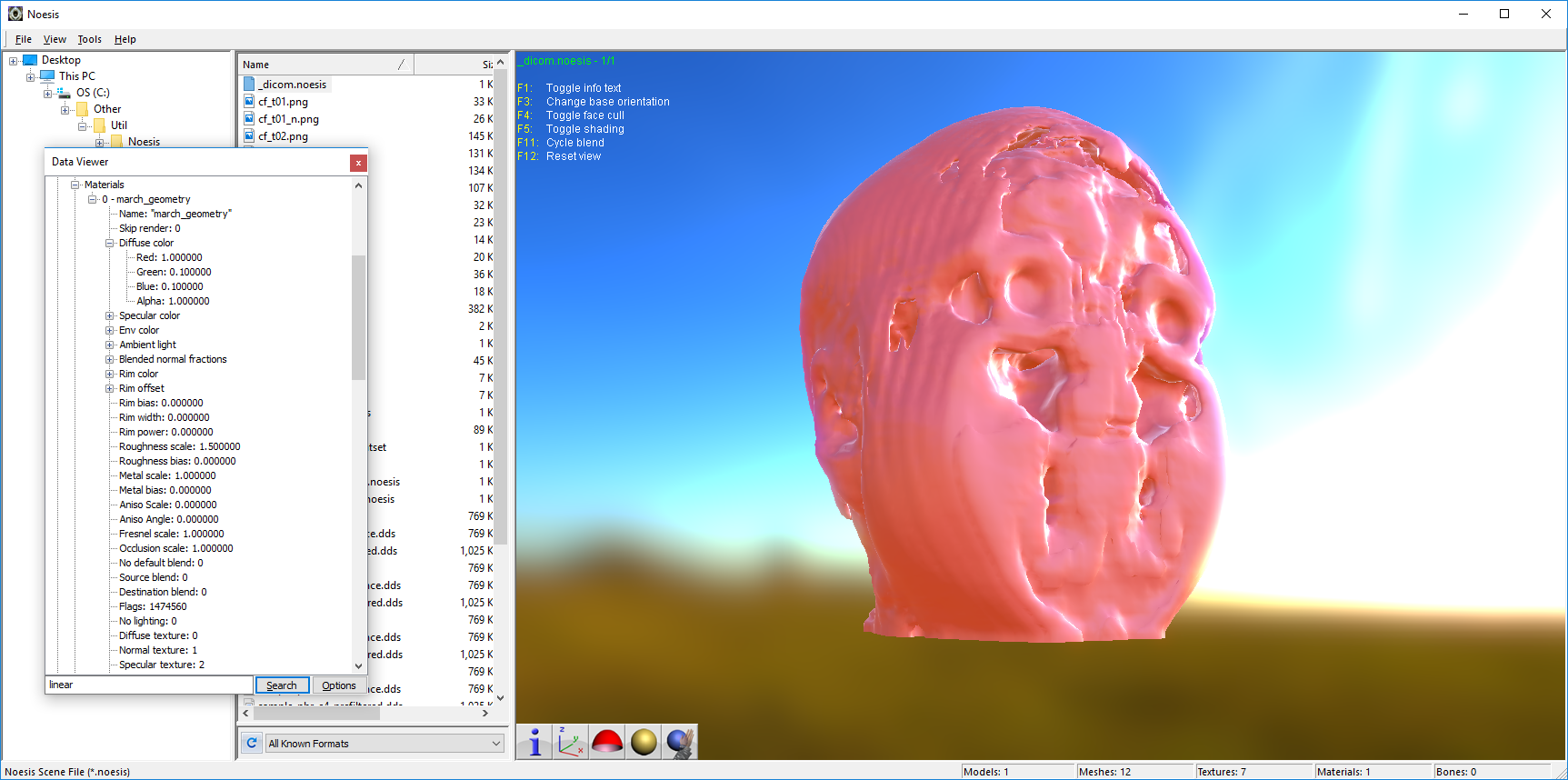
- Developer: Rich Whitehouse
- Release: 2010; 16 years ago
- Stable release: 4.4.64 / July 16, 2024; 2 years ago
- Operating system: Windows XP and later
- Type: Image viewer, 3D model and animation viewer, medical imaging software (DICOM, Analyze 7.5, NifTI-1), reverse engineering software
- License: Freeware
- Website: www.richwhitehouse.com/noesis/nms/index.php

Noesis is software for viewing, converting, and reverse engineering data. Common data types supported by the software include images, 3D models, medical imaging (DICOM), and animation.

Noesis was created and is actively maintained by video game programmer Rich Whitehouse. The software supports hundreds of file formats, with a focus on allowing users to understand and analyze data in a way which would not be possible without reverse engineering. This is exemplified by the software's support for many proprietary file formats (including, more recently, animation data from the video game Final Fantasy XV), in tandem with a continued focus on user plugins and Python scripting features. Noesis has also received a great deal of community support, with native plugins and scripts available to add support for hundreds of additional file formats.

== History ==
A full version history is maintained in the software's current documentation. Articles have been written to elaborate upon the addition of notable features throughout development, including Python support, physically based rendering, and Autodesk FBX support.

Noesis has been leveraged for numerous well-publicized projects. In late 2010, a video was published to demonstrate the software's real-time physics simulation and Microsoft Kinect motion capture ability. Footage of a real-world subject being tracked in a range-mapped depth view can be seen alongside a rendered view of Ivy, a character from the Soulcalibur series. The character's movements echo the subject's and demonstrate real-time collision between the character's limbs and breasts. The video was featured by numerous press outlets, including Kotaku and The Escapist.

In December 2018, a script was created for Noesis in order to generate levels for the video game DOOM by tracking the movements of a Roomba. This script, titled DOOMBA, received coverage from a wide range of press outlets, including Variety, Engadget, Popular Mechanics, Polygon, PC Gamer, Digital Trends, Hackaday, Gizmodo, and The Verge.
