= BioDigital =

BioDigital, Inc.
- Industry: Biotechnology, Life Science, Health
- Founded: 2013; 13 years ago
- Founder: Frank Sculli, John Qualter, Aaron Oliker
- Headquarters: 44 W 18 Street, New York City, United States of America
- Website: www.biodigital.com

BioDigital is a New York-based biomedical visualization company that is often referred to as being "Google Earth for the Human Body". BioDigital offers an interactive, 3D software platform that enables individuals and businesses to explore and visualize health information. Their flagship product, the BioDigital Human, is a "searchable, customizable map of the human body".

The BioDigital Human Platform has over a million users, including doctors, medical students, and yoga instructors. New York University School of Medicine has used the software to teach medical students about anatomy.

The company also offers a set of API's that allow developers to use the company's imaging technology.

== History ==
The company started as a consulting business in 2002, founded on the premise that 3D technology could be leveraged to make medical topics more comprehensible, accessible, and compelling. In 2011, the company expanded their technology to reach the greater public, compiling all visualizations into a proprietary web-based virtual model of the human body, the BioDigital Human. The BioDigital Human was one of the early systems to leverage WebGL, which allows any supported browser to render 3D models in webpages without plugins.

In 2013, the company received a series of funding led by FirstMark Capital, New York University’s NYU Innovation Fund, a group of angel investors.

== Awards and recognition ==
- TEDMED 2012 – Featured presentation of the BioDigital Human.
- SXSW Classic Interactive Award (2013) – Winner in the interactive category.
- ON for Learning Award (2014) – From Common Sense Media.
- Web Health Awards (June 2014) – Recognized as a Best Health Digital Resource.
- Webby Award (2015) – Best Health Website.
- Edison Awards (2015) – Silver finalist in Research & Education.

== Partnerships ==
BioDigital has partnered with the international charity Smile Train for the creation of a cleft lip and palate simulator. The simulator is an interactive teaching tool designed to train surgeons in developing countries on cleft lip and palate surgical repair. BioDigital and Smile Train received an award for Outstanding Achievement in Modeling & Simulation by the National Training Simulation Association in December 2013. The companies were selected to showcase the technology at the 2014 TEDMED Conference in Washington DC.
