= GNUmed =

Electronic medical record software

GNUmed practice software
- GNUmed Logo
- Original author: Horst Herb
- Developer: GNU Project
- Stable release: Client 1.8.18, Server 22.28 / January 28, 2024; 23 months ago
- Repository: github.com/ncqgm/gnumed.git
- Written in: Python
- Operating system: Cross-platform
- Type: Electronic medical record
- License: GPL-2.0-or-later
- Website: www.gnumed.org

GNUmed is a Free/Libre electronic medical record (EMR) for Unix-like systems (BSD, Linux, and UNIX systems), Microsoft Windows, macOS and other platforms. GNUmed aims to provide medical software that respects the privacy of patients and that is based on open standards.

GNUmed is based on third party projects such as free software/open source DBMS PostgreSQL and is written mostly in Python. It is supported by a graphical user interface (GUI) based on WxPython.

== History ==
The first version of the GNUmed was created by Horst Herb. When Herb ceased active development, the development of GNUmed was picked up by Karsten Hilbert who took over as project leader and partly overhauled the project.

Karsten Hilbert was not alone in his efforts. Several other developers joined the team and helped at one time or the other: Syan Tan, Ian Haywood, Hilmar Berger, Sebastian Hilbert, Carlos Moro, Michael Bonert, Richard Terry, Tony Lembke and many more. While some concentrated on coding, many others, like Jim Busser and Rogerio Luz Coelho helped by creating documentation or by submitting other comments.

The name was initially chosen to give credit to the GNU project and GNUmed's connection to the medical profession. The logo depicts a Gnu as a reference to the GNU project accompanied by a Python as a reference to the programming language as well as to the medical profession.

At the time, GNUmed was just another free software project aiming to become an alternative to the established EMRs. It has since evolved to rival other EMRs in terms of functionality and performance.

== Usage ==
GNUmed is primarily used to manage electronic medical records. It provides means of archiving paper records as well as collecting metadata on these records. Some uses include administrative tasks such as adding and activating patients, and recording tasks such as data on patients' allergies or immunization records.

== Features ==
GNUmed supports a variety of features, many implemented as plugins which extend the core functionality. These can range a medical paper record archiving system to vaccination status handling. A list of features is provided in GNUmed's documentation system.

By making use of GNUmed's interface 3rd party software can interact with GNUmed to make use of its features.

== See also ==
- List of GNU packages
- GNU Project
- GNU Health

== General references ==
- Bauer, Achim. "Spezialisiertes KIS" [Specialized HIS (hospital information system)] (PDF) (in German). Archived from the original (PDF) on 2012-03-19.
- Kantor, Gareth S.; et al. (2003). "Open-source Software and the Primary Care EMR". J Am Med Inform Assoc. 10 (6): 616, author reply 617. doi:10.1197/jamia.M1403. PMC 264443. PMID 12925540.
