= OpenEMR =

Open-source health record system

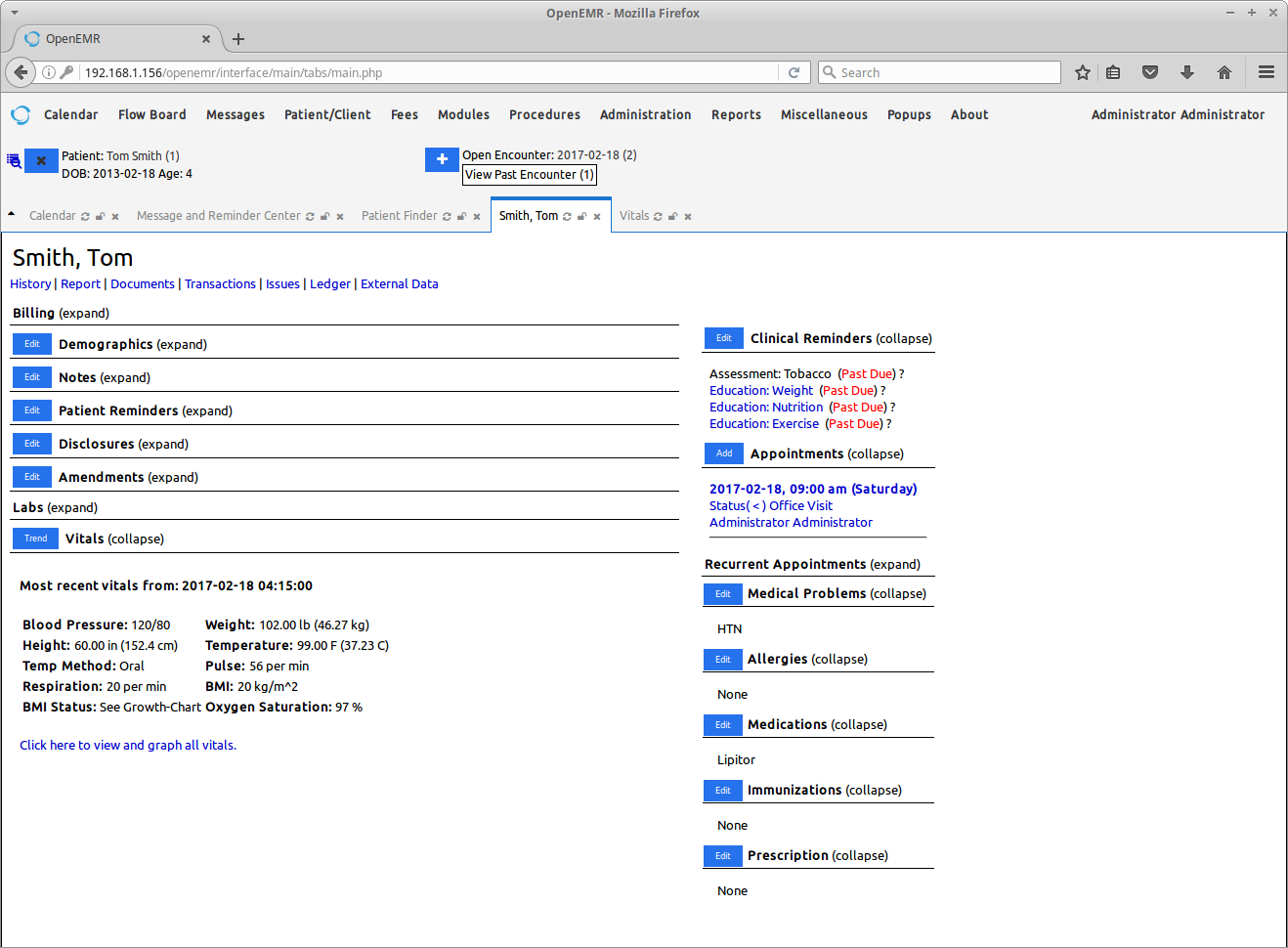
- Screenshot of the Patient Summary Screen
- Release: August 13, 2002; 24 years ago
- Stable release: 7.0.3.4 / 18 May 2025; 15 months ago
- Operating system: Linux, Unix-like, macOS, Windows
- Available in: 34 languages
- Type: Medical practice management software, Electronic Medical Records
- License: GNU General Public License
- Website: www.open-emr.org
- Repository: github.com/openemr/openemr

OpenEMR is a medical practice management software founded in 2001. The software is written in PHP and licensed under the terms of the GNU General Public License (GPL).

== Features ==
- ONC Complete Ambulatory EHR Certified
- Patient demographics
- Patient scheduling
- Electronic health records
- Prescriptions
- Electronic prescribing
- EPCS
- Medical Billing
- Clinical decision rules
- Patient portal
- Reports

== History ==
OpenEMR was originally developed by Synitech and version 1.0 was released in June 2001 as MedicalPractice Professional (MP Pro). Much of the code was then reworked to comply with the Health Insurance Portability and Accountability Act (HIPAA) and to improve security, and the product was reintroduced as OpenEMR version 1.3 a year later, in July 2002. On 13 August 2002 OpenEMR was released to the public under the GNU General Public License (GPL) on SourceForge. The project evolved through version 2.0 and the Pennington Firm (Pennfirm) took over as its primary maintainer in 2003. Walt Pennington transferred the OpenEMR software repository to SourceForge in March 2005. Mr. Pennington also established Rod Roark, Andres Paglayan and James Perry Jr. as administrators of the project. Walt Pennington, Andres Paglayan and James Perry eventually took other directions and were replaced by Brady Miller in August 2009. Robert Down became an administrator of the project in March 2017. Matthew Vita was an administrator of the project from July 2017 until February 2020. Jerry Padgett was an administrator of the project from June 2019 until February 2026. Stephen Waite became an administrator of the project in February 2020. Stephen Nielson became an administrator of the project in January 2022. Asher Densmore-Lynn became an administrator of the project in January 2024. Michael Smith became an administrator of the project in February 2026. Eric Stern became an administrator of the project in February 2026. So at this time Rod Roark, Brady Miller, Robert Down, Stephen Waite, Stephen Nielson, Asher Densmore-Lynn, Michael Smith and Eric Stern are the project's co-administrators.

In 2018 Project Insecurity found almost 30 security flaws in the system, which were all disclosed in a coordinated fashion.

The OpenEMR Foundation is a nonprofit entity that was organized April, 2019 to support the OpenEMR project. The OpenEMR Foundation is the entity that holds the ONC EHR Certification with SLI Compliance. OEMR was a nonprofit entity that was organized in July, 2010 to support the OpenEMR project. OEMR was the former entity that held the ONC EHR Certifications with ICSA and InfoGard Labs.
