= Assessment and plan =

Component of an admission note

The assessment and plan (abbreviated A/P or A&P) correspond to the final two components of the SOAP note format, which is a widely used method of clinical documentation.

The assessment section includes a synthesis of subjective and objective information to formulate a differential diagnosis. This information is gathered from the patient's history of the present illness, physical examination, laboratory studies, and imaging findings, when applicable. Differential diagnoses may be prioritized in order of their likelihood or clinical significance.

The plan outlines diagnostic testing, interventions, monitoring, patient education, and follow-up recommendations intended to address the problems identified in the assessment. Plans are often organized by problem or organ system. Each active issue should be followed with diagnostic and therapeutic recommendations. These may include medications, laboratory studies, procedures, and surgeries.

- problems are commonly derived from
  - chief complaint
  - history of present illness
  - review of systems (rarely; these should have been picked up and incorporated as new chief complaints during the interview)
  - physical exam (rarely; these should have been picked up and incorporated as new chief complaints during the exam)
  - social history, including counseling for smoking, alcohol, and illicit drug use
  - family history
  - medications may indicate problems that need to be addressed in the treatment of the other problems
    - E.g., dyslipidemia controlled with a statin.

== See also ==
- SOAP note
- Medical record
