= Medicine =

Diagnosis, treatment, and prevention of illness

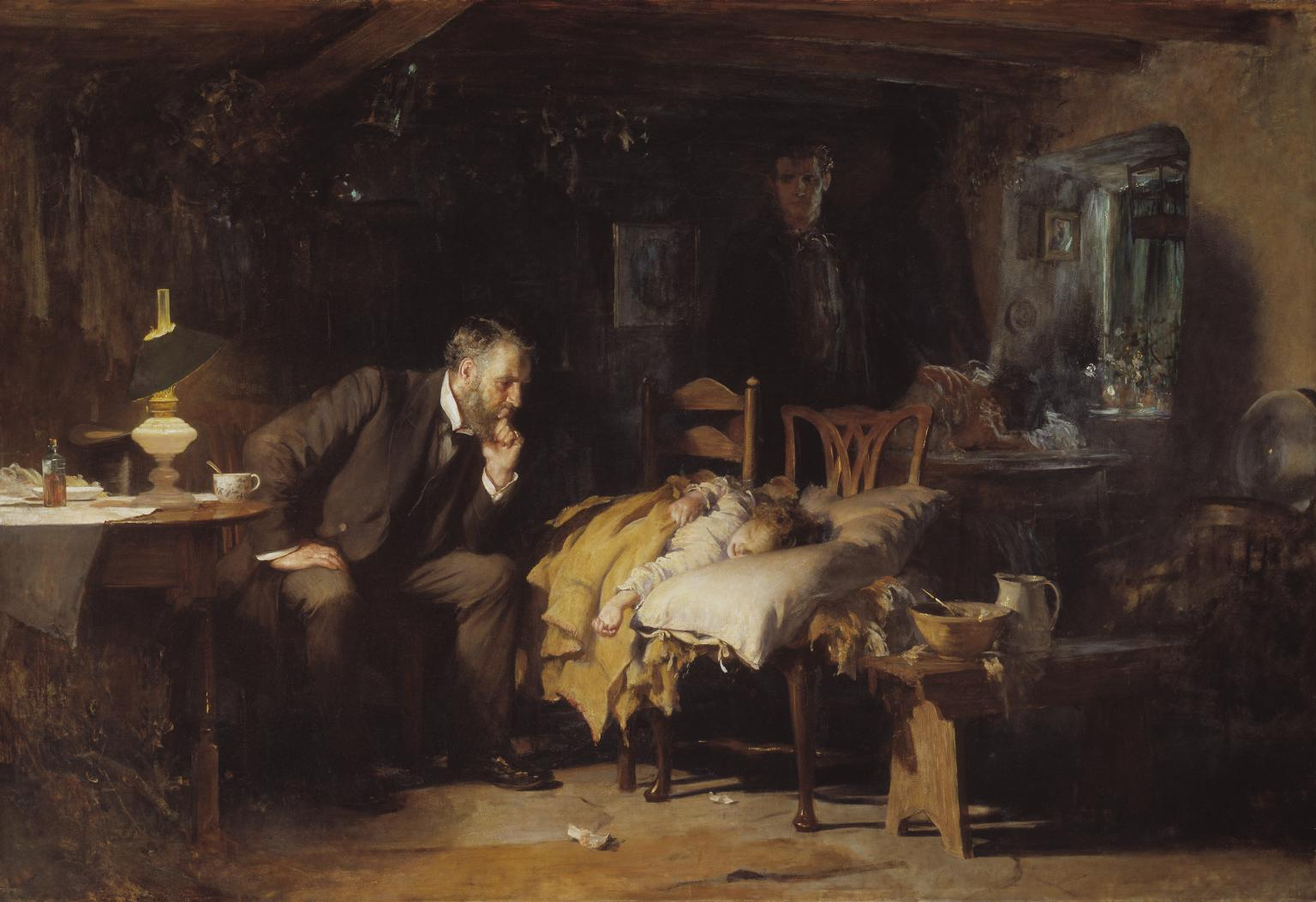
The Doctor by Sir Luke Fildes (1891)

Medicine is the science and practice of caring for patients, managing the diagnosis, prognosis, prevention, treatment and palliation of their injury or disease, while promoting their health. Medicine encompasses a variety of health care practices which evolved to maintain and restore health through the prevention and treatment of illness and infection. Contemporary medicine applies biomedical sciences, biomedical research, genetics, and medical technology to diagnose, treat, and prevent injury and disease, typically through various pharmaceuticals or surgery, but also through therapies such as psychotherapy, external splints and traction, medical devices, biologics, and ionizing radiation, amongst others.

Medicine has been practiced since prehistoric times, and for most of this time it was an art (an area of creativity and skill), frequently having connections to the religious and philosophical beliefs of local culture. For example, a medicine man would apply herbs and say prayers for healing, or an ancient philosopher and physician would apply bloodletting according to the theories of humorism, or the four humors. In recent centuries, since the advent of modern science, most medicine has become a combination of art and science (both basic and applied, under the umbrella of medical science). For example, while stitching technique for sutures is an art learned through practice, science provides knowledge of what happens at the cellular and molecular level in the tissues being stitched.

Prescientific forms of medicine, now known as traditional medicine or folk medicine, remain commonly used in the absence of scientific medicine and are thus called alternative medicine. Alternative treatments outside of scientific medicine with ethical, safety and efficacy concerns are termed quackery or being based on fringe science.

== Etymology ==
Medicine (UK: /ˈmɛdsɪn/, US: /ˈmɛdɪsɪn/) is the science and practice of the diagnosis, prognosis, treatment, and prevention of disease. The word "medicine" is derived from Latin medicus, meaning "a physician". (Note: Etymology: Latin: medicina, from ars medicina 'the medical art', from medicus 'physician'. Cf. mederi 'to heal', etym. 'know the best course for', from PIE base *med- 'to measure, limit'. Cf. Greek: medos 'counsel, plan', Avestan: vi-mad 'physician') The word "physic" itself, from which "physician" derives, was the old word for what is now called a medicine, and also the field of medicine.

== Clinical practice ==
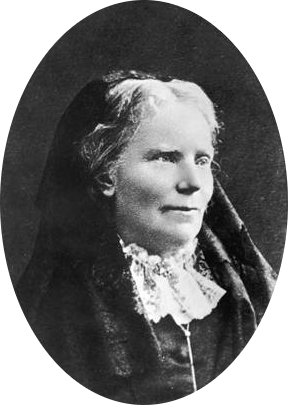
Elizabeth Blackwell, the first female physician in the United States graduated from SUNY Upstate (1847)

Medical availability and clinical practice vary across the world due to regional differences in culture and technology. Modern scientific medicine is highly developed and widespread in the Western world, whereas in some low-resource regions—including parts of Africa, the Pacific Islands of Oceania, Southeast Asia, and Latin America—populations often rely more heavily on traditional medicine. These practices consist of decentralized training structures and vary widely in empirical support; consequently, they may lack formal regulatory oversight or robust evidence for clinical efficacy.

In the developed world, evidence-based medicine (EBM) is not universally applied in clinical practice; for example, a 2007 survey of literature reviews found that about 49% of medical interventions lacked sufficient evidence to support either benefit or harm. However, medical practitioners who apply an intervention with uncertain efficacy without adequate justification, transparency, or patient consent may violate the bioethical principle of non-maleficence, a core tenet of biomedical ethics historically associated with the Hippocratic Oath, which emphasizes a primary duty to "first, do no harm."

In modern clinical practice, physicians and mid-level practitioners such as physician assistants personally assess patients to diagnose, prognose, treat, and prevent disease using clinical judgment. An initial medical encounter with a patient typically begins with a review of the patient's medical history and medical record, followed by a medical interview and a physical examination. Basic diagnostic medical devices (e.g., stethoscope, tongue depressor) are typically used. After examining for signs and interviewing for symptoms, the doctor may order medical tests (e.g., blood tests), take a biopsy, or prescribe pharmaceutical drugs or other therapies. Differential diagnosis methods help to rule out conditions based on the information provided. During the encounter, properly informing the patient of all relevant facts is an important part of the relationship and the development of trust within the context of the doctor-patient relationship. The medical encounter is then documented in the medical record, which is a legal document in many jurisdictions. Follow-up encounters may be shorter but follow the same general procedure, and specialists follow a similar process. The diagnosis and treatment may take only a few minutes or a few weeks, depending on the complexity of the issue.

The components of the medical interview and encounter are:

- Chief complaint (CC): the reason for the current medical visit. These are the symptoms. They are in the patient's own words and are recorded along with the duration of each one. Also called chief concern or presenting complaint.
- Current activity: occupation, hobbies, what the patient actually does professionally and non-professionally.
- Family history (FH): listing of diseases in the family that may impact the patient. A family tree is sometimes used.
- History of present illness (HPI): the chronological order of events of symptoms and further clarification of each symptom. Distinguishable from history of previous illness, often called past medical history (PMH). Medical history comprises HPI and PMH.
- Medications (Rx): what drugs the patient takes including prescribed, over-the-counter, and home remedies, as well as alternative and herbal medicines or remedies. Allergies are also recorded.
- Past medical history (PMH/PMHx): concurrent medical problems, past hospitalizations and operations, injuries, past infectious diseases or vaccinations, history of known allergies.
- Review of systems (ROS) or systems inquiry: a set of additional questions to ask, which may be missed on HPI: a general enquiry (have you noticed any weight loss, change in sleep quality, fevers, lumps and bumps? etc.), followed by questions on the body's main organ systems (heart, lungs, digestive tract, urinary tract, etc.).
- Social history (SH): birthplace, residences, marital history, social and economic status, habits (including diet, medications, tobacco, alcohol).

The physical examination is the examination of the patient for medical signs of disease that are objective and observable, in contrast to symptoms that are volunteered by the patient and are not necessarily objectively observable. The healthcare provider uses sight, hearing, touch, and sometimes smell (e.g., in infection, uremia, diabetic ketoacidosis). Four actions are the basis of physical examination: inspection, palpation (feel), percussion (tap to determine resonance characteristics), and auscultation (listen), generally in that order, although auscultation occurs prior to percussion and palpation for abdominal assessments.

The clinical examination involves the study of:

- Abdomen and rectum
- Cardiovascular (heart and blood vessels)
- General appearance of the patient and specific indicators of disease (nutritional status, presence of jaundice, pallor or clubbing)
- Genitalia (and pregnancy if the patient is or could be pregnant)
- Head, eye, ear, nose, and throat (HEENT)
- Musculoskeletal (including spine and extremities)
- Neurological (consciousness, awareness, brain, vision, cranial nerves, spinal cord and peripheral nerves)
- Psychiatric (orientation, mental state, mood, evidence of abnormal perception or thought).
- Respiratory (large airways and lungs)
- Skin
- Vital signs including height, weight, body temperature, blood pressure, pulse, respiration rate, and hemoglobin oxygen saturation

It is to likely focus on areas of interest highlighted in the medical history and may not include everything listed above.

The treatment plan may include ordering additional medical laboratory tests and medical imaging studies, starting therapy, referral to a specialist, or watchful observation. A follow-up may be advised. Depending upon the health insurance plan and the managed care system, various forms of "utilization review", such as prior authorization of tests, may place barriers on accessing expensive services.

The medical decision-making (MDM) process includes the analysis and synthesis of all the above data to come up with a list of possible diagnoses (the differential diagnoses), along with an idea of what needs to be done to obtain a definitive diagnosis that would explain the patient's problem.

On subsequent visits, the process may be repeated in an abbreviated manner to obtain any new history, symptoms, physical findings, lab or imaging results, or specialist consultations.

== Institutions ==
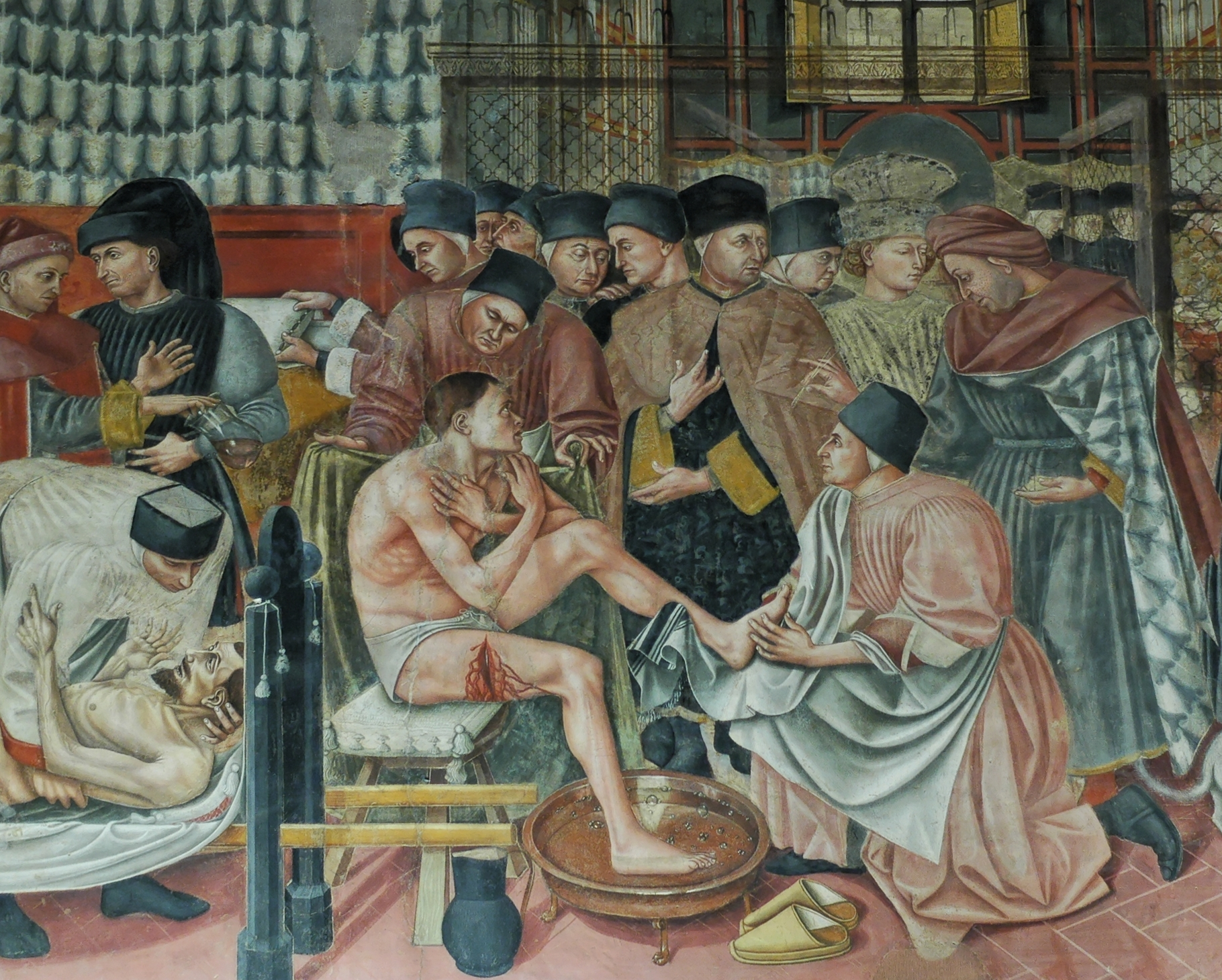
The Hospital of Santa Maria della Scala, fresco by Domenico di Bartolo, 1441–1442

Contemporary medicine is, in general, conducted within health care systems. Legal, credentialing, and financing frameworks are established by individual governments, augmented on occasion by international organizations, such as churches. The characteristics of any given health care system have a significant impact on the way medical care is provided.

From ancient times, Christian emphasis on practical charity gave rise to the development of systematic nursing and hospitals, and the Catholic Church today remains the largest non-government provider of medical services in the world. Advanced industrial countries (with the exception of the United States) and many developing countries provide medical services through a system of universal health care that aims to guarantee care for all through a single-payer health care system or compulsory private or cooperative health insurance. This is intended to ensure that the entire population has access to medical care on the basis of need rather than ability to pay. Delivery may be via private medical practices, state-owned hospitals and clinics, or charities, most commonly a combination of all three.

Most tribal societies provide no guarantee of healthcare for the population as a whole. In such societies, healthcare is available to those who can afford to pay for it, have self-insured it (either directly or as part of an employment contract), or may be covered by care financed directly by the government or tribe.

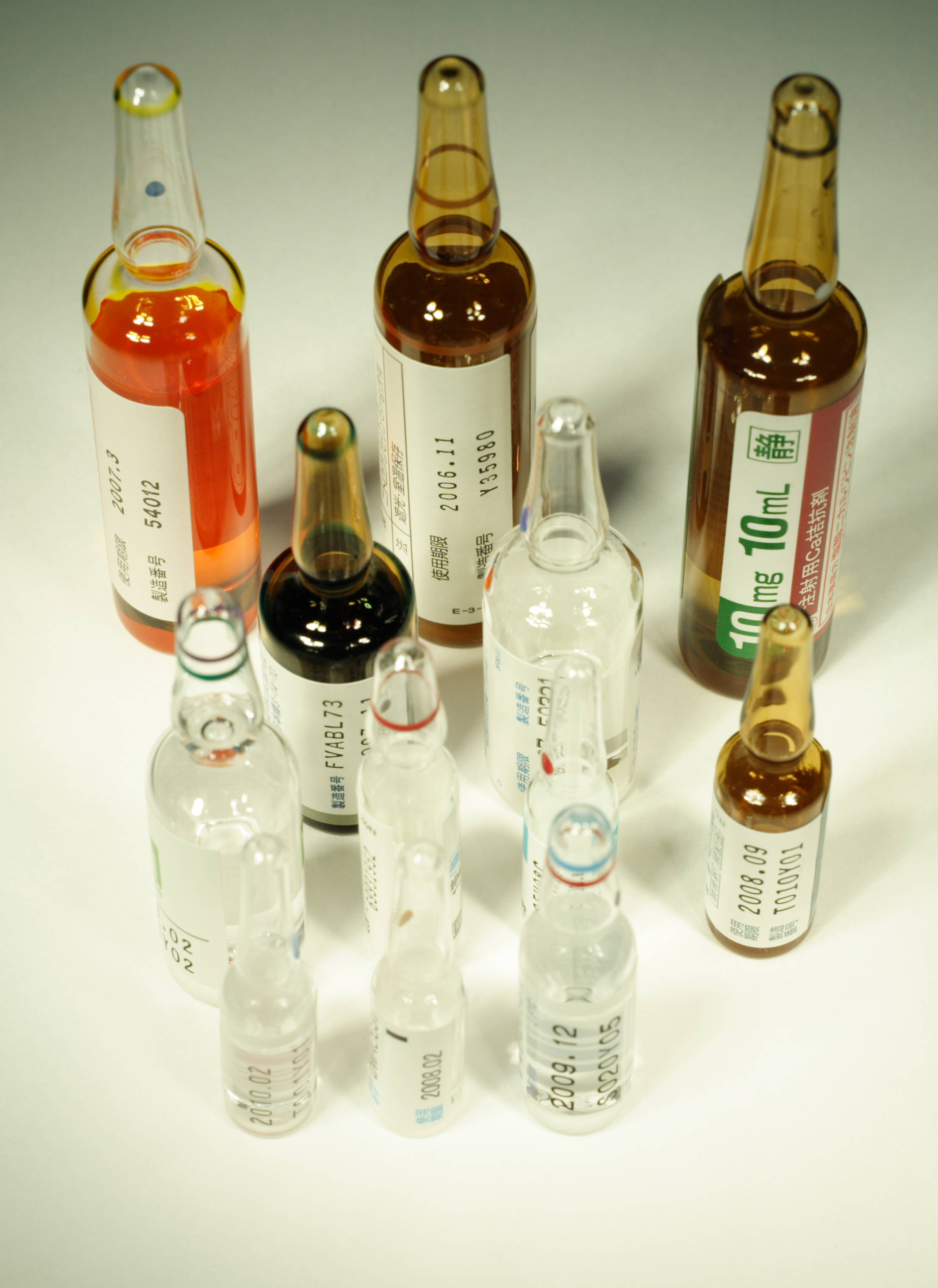
Modern drug ampoules

Transparency of information is another factor defining a delivery system. Access to information on conditions, treatments, quality, and pricing greatly affects the choice of patients/consumers and, therefore, the incentives of medical professionals. While the US healthcare system has come under fire for its lack of openness, new legislation may encourage greater openness. There is a perceived tension between the demand for transparency and concerns over patient confidentiality and the commercial misuse of medical data. Advocates argue that openness helps patients make informed decisions, while critics warn it can expose sensitive records and invite exploitation by insurers, employers, or marketers. Balancing accountability with privacy remains a central challenge.

The health professionals who provide care in medicine comprise multiple professions, such as medics, nurses, physiotherapists, and psychologists. These professions will have their own ethical standards, professional education, and bodies. The medical profession has been conceptualized from a sociological perspective.

=== Delivery ===
Provision of medical care is classified into primary, secondary, and tertiary care categories.

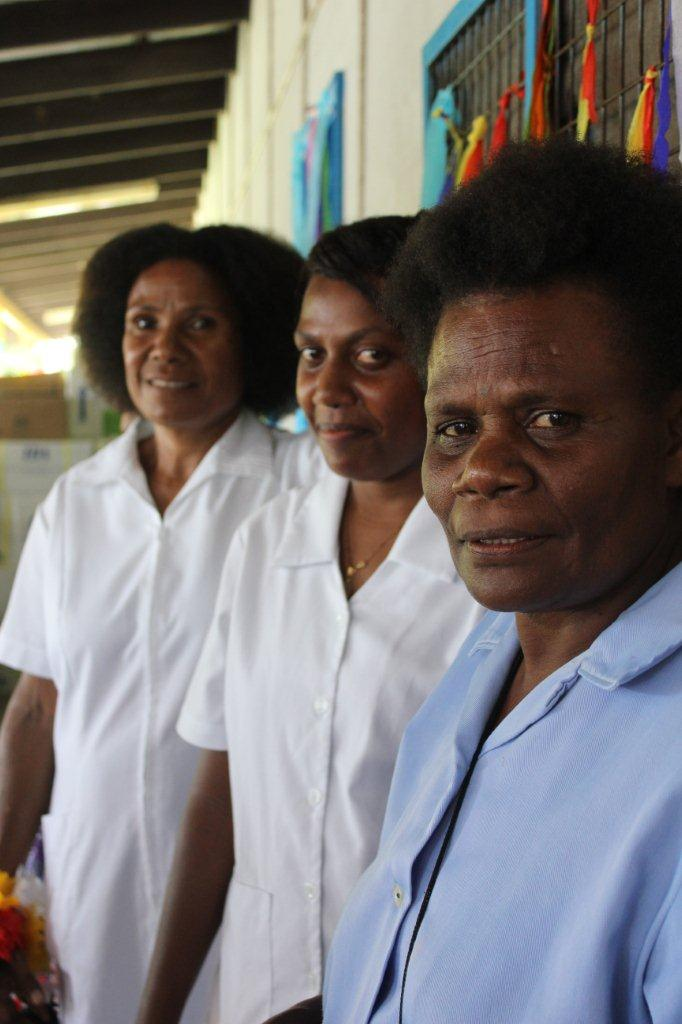
Nurses in Kokopo, East New Britain, Papua New Guinea

Primary care medical services are provided by physicians, physician assistants, nurse practitioners, or other health professionals who have first contact with a patient seeking medical treatment or care. These occur in physician offices, medical practices, clinics, nursing homes, schools, patients' homes, and in other places that are typically geographically close to where patients live, work or study. About 90% of medical visits can be satisfactorily and effectively dealt with by primary care provider(s). Primary care visits might include treatment of minor, acute or chronic illnesses, preventive care, and health education. Primary care is directed to the health of entire populations and thus providers care for patients of all ages and sexes.

Secondary care medical services are provided by medical specialists in their offices, practices or clinics, or at local community hospitals, to patients referred by the primary care provider who first diagnosed or treated the patient. 'Referrals' are made of those patients who required the particular expertise of, or specific procedures performed by, specialists. Secondary care services include both ambulatory care and inpatient services, emergency departments, some intensive care medicine, some surgeries and related services, physical therapy, labor and delivery, endoscopy units, diagnostic laboratory and medical imaging services, hospice centers, and others depending on the health services systems within which the care is being delivered. Some primary care providers may also take care of hospitalized patients and deliver babies in a secondary care setting.

Tertiary care medical services are provided by specialist teams of providers in larger, more specialised hospitals or regional medical centers, which are equipped with diagnostic and treatment facilities not typically available at local (often smaller) hospitals. This allows for the treatment and care of patients with more complex or urgent or serious medical conditions, which in turn may require more expertise (including multi-disciplinary teams) and resources (facilities, staff, bed days) to effectively treat. Tertiary care may include that provided at burn treatment or trauma centers, advanced neonatology unit services, organ transplants, high-risk pregnancy and child delivery, radiation oncology, and very many other forms of specialist and intensive care.

Modern medical care also depends on the keeping and use of information, including about a particular patient—still kept in many health care settings on paper 'medical records', but increasingly nowadays by electronic means.

In low-income countries, modern healthcare is often too expensive for the average person. International healthcare policy researchers have advocated that "user fees" be removed in these areas to ensure access; however, even with removal of patient fee obligations, significant costs and barriers remain for the poor and the sick in accessing sufficient care.

Separation of prescribing and dispensing is a practice in medicine and pharmacy in which the physician who provides a medical prescription is different from the pharmacist who provides the prescription drug to the patient. In the Western world there are centuries of tradition and practice differentiating pharmacists from physicians, and two quite separate professions developed. In many Asian countries, on the other hand, it is traditional for physicians to also deliver drugs directly to patients, at least in some cases. This model is also being used increasingly in the west: especially for simply-treated conditions (eg, those needing general antibiotics), in remote locations, with vulnerable communities of patients, and in small or integrated medical facilities.

== Branches ==
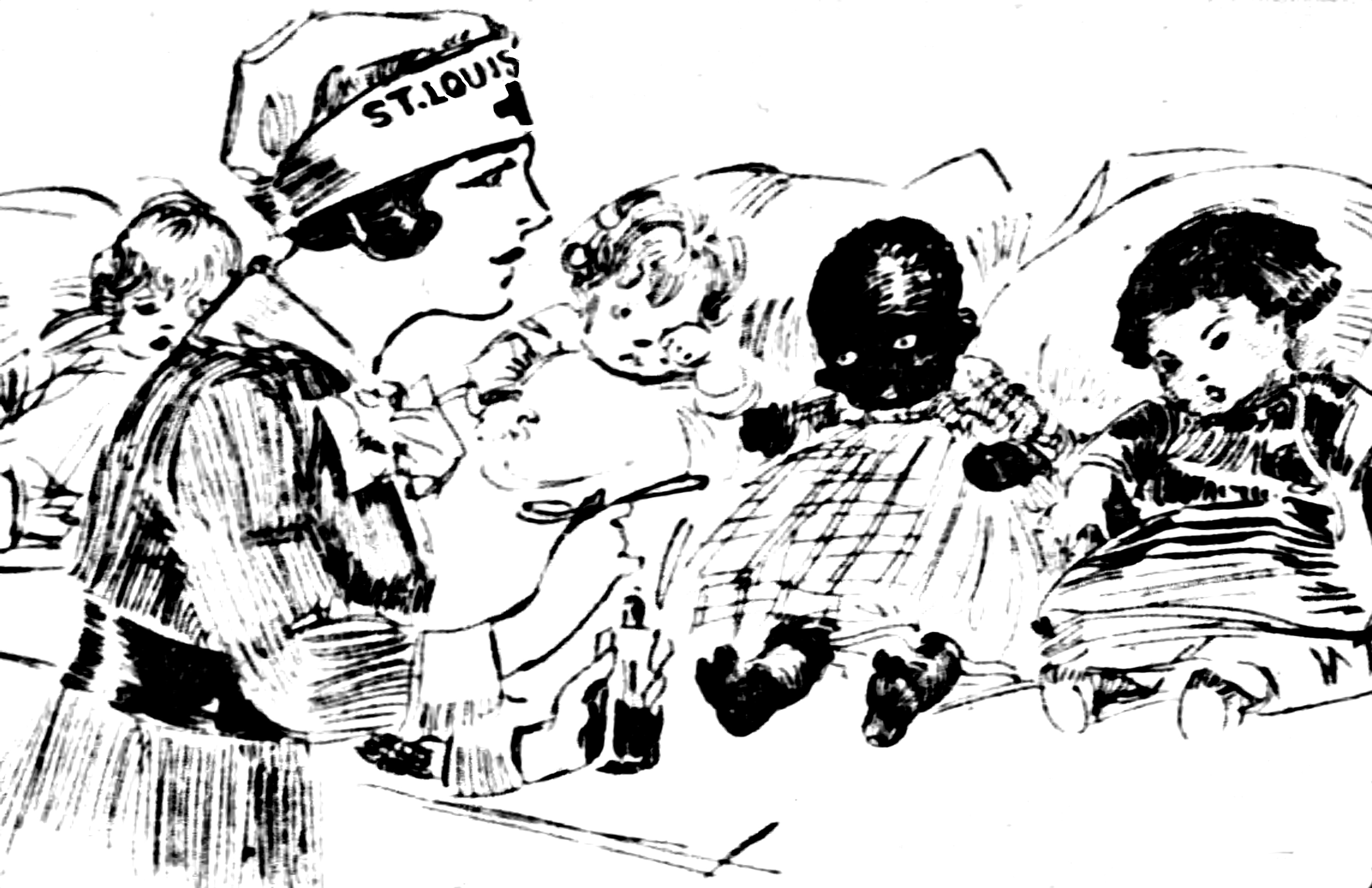
Drawing by Marguerite Martyn (1918) of a visiting nurse in St. Louis, Missouri, with medicine and babies

Working together as an interdisciplinary team, many health professionals besides medical practitioners are involved in the delivery of modern health care. Examples include: nurses, emergency medical technicians and paramedics, laboratory scientists, pharmacists, podiatrists, physiotherapists, respiratory therapists, speech therapists, occupational therapists, radiographers, dietitians, and bioengineers, medical physicists, surgeons, surgeon's assistant, surgical technologist.

The scope and sciences underpinning human medicine overlap many other fields. A patient admitted to the hospital is usually under the care of a specific team based on their main presenting problem, e.g., the cardiology team, who then may interact with other specialties, e.g., surgical, radiology, to help diagnose or treat the main problem or any subsequent complications/developments.

Physicians have many specializations and sub-specializations in certain branches of medicine, which are listed below. There are variations from country to country regarding which specialties certain subspecialties are in.

The main branches of medicine are:

- Basic sciences of medicine; this is what every physician is educated in, and some return to in biomedical research.
- Interdisciplinary fields, where different medical specialties are mixed to function in certain occasions.
- Medical specialties

=== Basic sciences ===
- Anatomy is the study of the physical structure of organisms. In contrast to macroscopic or gross anatomy, cytology and histology are concerned with microscopic structures.
- Biochemistry is the study of the chemistry taking place in living organisms, especially the structure and function of their chemical components.
- Biomechanics is the study of the structure and function of biological systems by means of the methods of Mechanics.
- Biophysics is an interdisciplinary science that uses the methods of physics and physical chemistry to study biological systems.
- Biostatistics is the application of statistics to biological fields in the broadest sense. A knowledge of biostatistics is essential in the planning, evaluation, and interpretation of medical research. It is also fundamental to epidemiology and evidence-based medicine.
- Cytology is the microscopic study of individual cells.

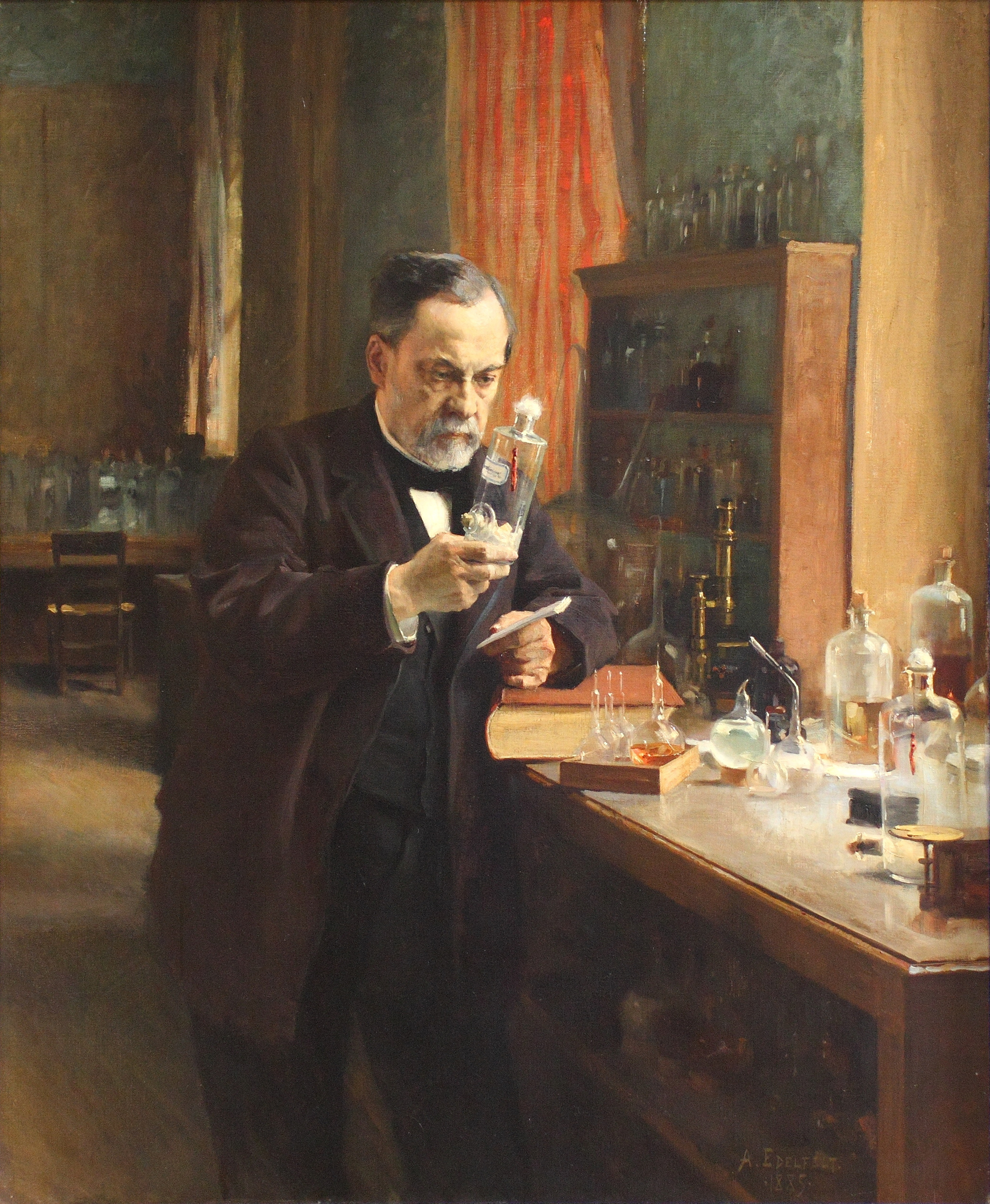
Louis Pasteur, as portrayed in his laboratory, 1885 by Albert Edelfelt

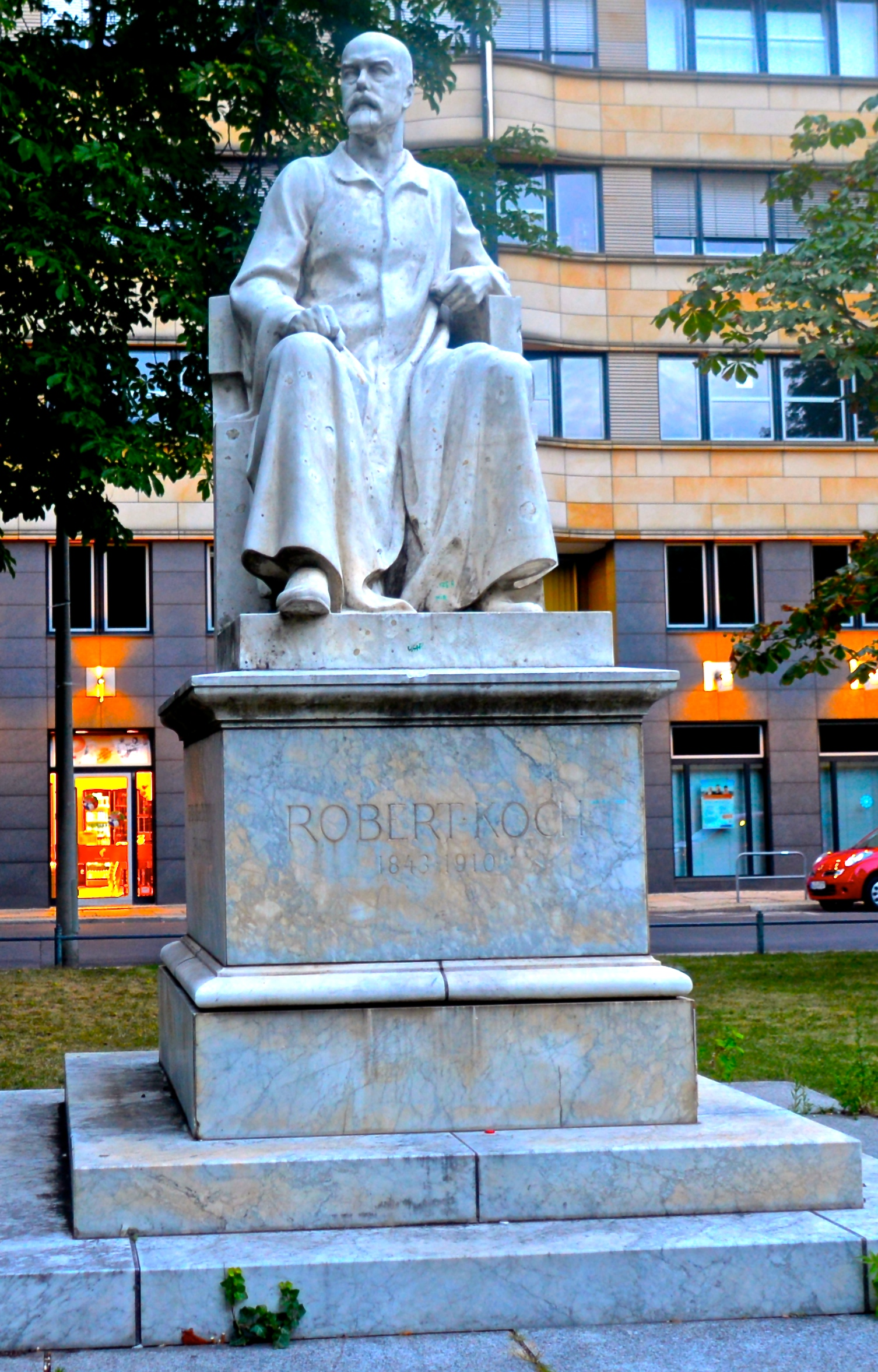
Statue of Robert Koch in Berlin

- Embryology is the study of the early development of organisms.
- Endocrinology is the study of hormones and their effect throughout the body of animals.
- Epidemiology is the study of the demographics of disease processes, and includes, but is not limited to, the study of epidemics.
- Genetics is the study of genes, and their role in biological inheritance.
- Gynecology is the study of female reproductive system.
- Histology is the study of the structures of biological tissues by light microscopy, electron microscopy and immunohistochemistry.
- Immunology is the study of the immune system, which includes the innate and adaptive immune system in humans, for example.
- Lifestyle medicine is the study of the chronic conditions, and how to prevent, treat and reverse them.
- Medical physics is the study of the applications of physics principles in medicine.
- Microbiology is the study of cellular, multicellular, and acellular microorganisms such as protozoa, bacteria, fungi, viruses, prions, and viroids.
- Molecular biology is the study of molecular underpinnings of the process of replication, transcription and translation of the genetic material.
- Neuroscience includes those disciplines of science that are related to the study of the nervous system. A main focus of neuroscience is the biology and physiology of the human brain and spinal cord. Some related clinical specialties include neurology, neurosurgery and psychiatry.
- Nutrition science (theoretical focus) and dietetics (practical focus) is the study of the relationship of food and drink to health and disease, especially in determining an optimal diet. Medical nutrition therapy is done by dietitians and is prescribed for diabetes, cardiovascular diseases, weight and eating disorders, allergies, malnutrition, and neoplastic diseases.
- Pathology as a science is the study of disease – the causes, course, progression and resolution thereof.
- Pharmacology is the study of drugs and their actions.
- Photobiology is the study of the interactions between non-ionizing radiation and living organisms.
- Physiology is the study of the normal functioning of the body and the underlying regulatory mechanisms.
- Radiobiology is the study of the interactions between ionizing radiation and living organisms.
- Toxicology is the study of hazardous effects of drugs and poisons.

=== Specialties ===
In the broadest meaning of "medicine", there are many different specialties. In the UK, most specialities have their own body or college, which has its own entrance examination. These are collectively known as the Royal Colleges, although not all currently use the term "Royal". The development of a speciality is often driven by new technology (such as the development of effective anaesthetics) or ways of working (such as emergency departments); the new specialty leads to the formation of a unifying body of doctors and the prestige of administering their own examination.

Within medical circles, specialities usually fit into one of two broad categories: "Medicine" and "Surgery". "Medicine" refers to the practice of non-operative medicine, and most of its subspecialties require preliminary training in Internal Medicine. In the UK, this was traditionally evidenced by passing the examination for the Membership of the Royal College of Physicians (MRCP) or the equivalent college in Scotland or Ireland. "Surgery" refers to the practice of operative medicine, and most subspecialties in this area require preliminary training in General Surgery, which in the UK leads to membership of the Royal College of Surgeons of England (MRCS). At present, some specialties of medicine do not fit easily into either of these categories, such as radiology, pathology, or anesthesia. Most of these have branched from one or other of the two camps above; for example anaesthesia developed first as a faculty of the Royal College of Surgeons (for which MRCS/FRCS would have been required) before becoming the Royal College of Anaesthetists and membership of the college is attained by sitting for the examination of the Fellowship of the Royal College of Anesthetists (FRCA).

==== Surgical specialty ====
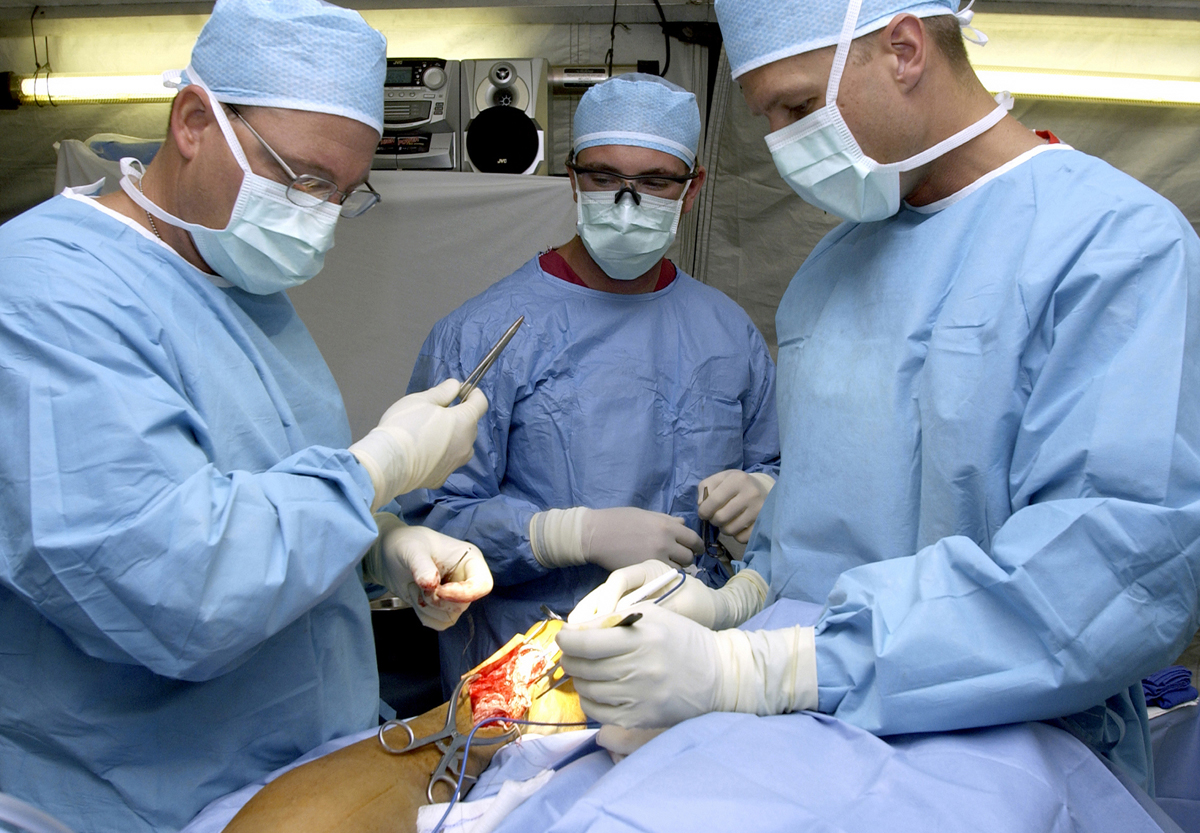
Surgeons in an operating room

Surgery is an ancient medical specialty that uses operative manual and instrumental techniques on a patient to investigate or treat a pathological condition such as disease or injury, to help improve bodily function or appearance or to repair unwanted ruptured areas (for example, a perforated ear drum). Surgeons must also manage pre-operative, post-operative, and potential surgical candidates on the hospital wards. In some centers, anesthesiology is part of the division of surgery (for historical and logistical reasons), although it is not a surgical discipline. Other medical specialties may employ surgical procedures, such as ophthalmology and dermatology, but are not considered surgical sub-specialties per se.

Surgical training in the U.S. requires a minimum of five years of residency after medical school. Sub-specialties of surgery often require seven or more years. In addition, fellowships can last an additional one to three years. Because post-residency fellowships can be competitive, many trainees devote two additional years to research. Thus in some cases surgical training will not finish until more than a decade after medical school. Furthermore, surgical training can be very difficult and time-consuming.

Surgical subspecialties include those a physician may specialize in after undergoing general surgery residency training as well as several surgical fields with separate residency training. Surgical subspecialties that one may pursue following general surgery residency training:

- Bariatric surgery
- Cardiovascular surgery – may also be pursued through a separate cardiovascular surgery residency track
- Colorectal surgery
- Endocrine surgery
- General surgery
- Hand surgery
- Hepato-pancreato-biliary surgery
- Minimally invasive surgery
- Pediatric surgery
- Plastic surgery – may also be pursued through a separate plastic surgery residency track
- Surgical critical care
- Surgical oncology
- Transplant surgery
- Trauma surgery
- Vascular surgery – may also be pursued through a separate vascular surgery residency track

Other surgical specialties within medicine with their own individual residency training:

- Dermatology
- Neurosurgery
- Ophthalmology
- Oral and maxillofacial surgery
- Orthopedic surgery
- Otorhinolaryngology
- Podiatric surgery – do not undergo medical school training, but rather separate training in podiatry school
- Urology

==== Internal medicine specialty ====
Internal medicine is the medical specialty dealing with the prevention, diagnosis, and treatment of adult diseases. According to some sources, an emphasis on internal structures is implied. In North America, specialists in internal medicine are commonly called "internists". Elsewhere, especially in Commonwealth nations, such specialists are often called physicians. These terms, internist or physician (in the narrow sense, common outside North America), generally exclude practitioners of gynecology and obstetrics, pathology, psychiatry, and especially surgery and its subspecialities.

Because their patients are often seriously ill or require complex investigations, internists do much of their work in hospitals. Formerly, many internists were not subspecialized; such general physicians would see any complex nonsurgical problem; this style of practice has become much less common. In modern urban practice, most internists are subspecialists: that is, they generally limit their medical practice to problems of one organ system or to one particular area of medical knowledge. For example, gastroenterologists and nephrologists specialize respectively in diseases of the gut and the kidneys.

In the Commonwealth of Nations and some other countries, specialist pediatricians and geriatricians are also described as specialist physicians (or internists) who have subspecialized by age of patient rather than by organ system. Elsewhere, especially in North America, general pediatrics is often a form of primary care.

There are many subspecialities (or subdisciplines) of internal medicine:

- Angiology/Vascular Medicine
- Bariatrics
- Cardiology
- Critical care medicine
- Endocrinology
- Gastroenterology
- Geriatrics
- Hematology
- Hepatology
- Infectious disease
- Nephrology
- Neurology
- Oncology
- Pediatrics
- Pulmonology/Pneumology/Respirology/chest medicine
- Rheumatology
- Sports Medicine

Training in internal medicine (as opposed to surgical training), varies considerably across the world: see the articles on medical education for more details. In North America, it requires at least three years of residency training after medical school, which can then be followed by a one- to three-year fellowship in the subspecialties listed above. In general, resident work hours in medicine are less than those in surgery, averaging about 60 hours per week in the US. This difference does not apply in the UK where all doctors are now required by law to work less than 48 hours per week on average.

==== Diagnostic specialties ====
- Clinical laboratory sciences are the clinical diagnostic services that apply laboratory techniques to diagnosis and management of patients. In the United States, these services are supervised by a pathologist. The personnel that work in these medical laboratory departments are technically trained staff who do not hold medical degrees, but who usually hold an undergraduate medical technology degree, who actually perform the tests, assays, and procedures needed for providing the specific services. Subspecialties include transfusion medicine, cellular pathology, clinical chemistry, hematology, clinical microbiology, and clinical immunology.
- Clinical neurophysiology is concerned with testing the physiology or function of the central and peripheral aspects of the nervous system. These kinds of tests can be divided into recordings of: (1) spontaneous or continuously running electrical activity, or (2) stimulus evoked responses. Subspecialties include electroencephalography, electromyography, evoked potential, nerve conduction study, and polysomnography. Sometimes these tests are performed by techs without a medical degree, but the interpretation of these tests is done by a medical professional.
- Diagnostic radiology is concerned with imaging of the body, e.g. by x-rays, x-ray computed tomography, ultrasonography, and nuclear magnetic resonance tomography. Interventional radiologists can access areas in the body under imaging for an intervention or diagnostic sampling.
- Nuclear medicine is concerned with studying human organ systems by administering radiolabelled substances (radiopharmaceuticals) to the body, which can then be imaged outside the body by a gamma camera or a PET scanner. Each radiopharmaceutical consists of two parts: a tracer that is specific for the function under study (e.g., neurotransmitter pathway, metabolic pathway, blood flow, or other), and a radionuclide (usually either a gamma-emitter or a positron emitter). There is a degree of overlap between nuclear medicine and radiology, as evidenced by the emergence of combined devices such as the PET/CT scanner.
- Pathology as a medical specialty is the branch of medicine that deals with the study of diseases and the morphologic, physiologic changes produced by them. As a diagnostic specialty, pathology can be considered the basis of modern scientific medical knowledge and plays a large role in evidence-based medicine. Many modern molecular tests such as flow cytometry, polymerase chain reaction (PCR), immunohistochemistry, cytogenetics, gene rearrangements studies, and fluorescent in situ hybridization (FISH) fall within the territory of pathology.

==== Other major specialties ====
The following are some major medical specialties that do not directly fit into any of the above-mentioned groups:

- Anesthesiology (also known as anaesthetics): concerned with the perioperative management of the surgical patient. The anesthesiologist's role during surgery is to prevent derangement in the vital organs' (i.e. brain, heart, kidneys) functions and postoperative pain. Outside of the operating room, the anesthesiology physician also serves the same function in the labor and delivery ward, and some are specialized in critical medicine.
- Emergency medicine is concerned with the diagnosis and treatment of acute or life-threatening conditions, including trauma, surgical, medical, pediatric, and psychiatric emergencies.
- Family medicine, family practice, general practice or primary care is, in many countries, the first port-of-call for patients with non-emergency medical problems. Family physicians often provide services across a broad range of settings including office based practices, emergency department coverage, inpatient care, and nursing home care.

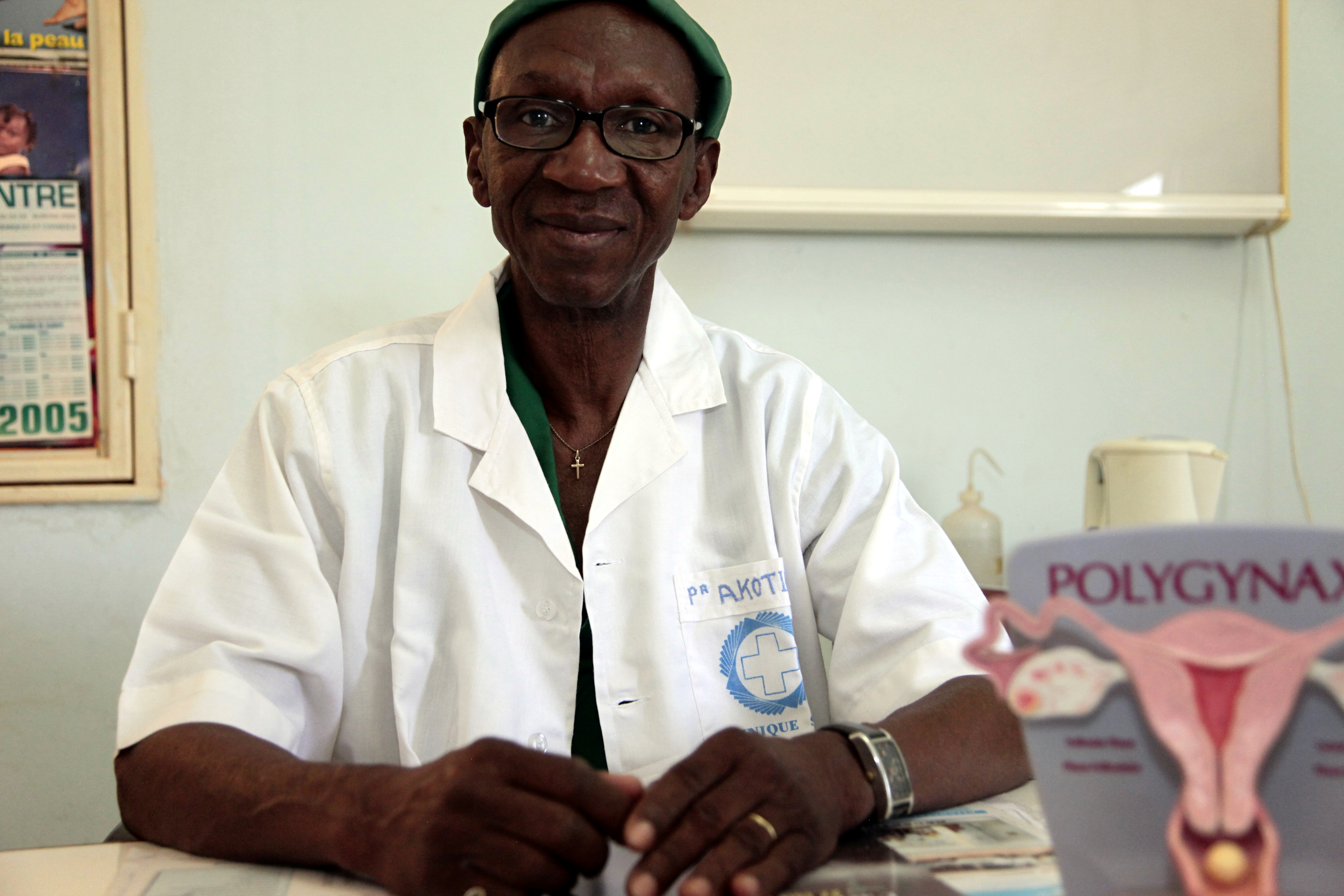
Gynecologist Michel Akotionga of Ouagadougou, Burkina Faso

- Medical genetics is concerned with the diagnosis and management of hereditary disorders.
- Neurology is concerned with diseases of the nervous system. In the UK, neurology is a subspecialty of general medicine.
- Obstetrics and gynecology (often abbreviated as OB/GYN (American English) or Obs & Gynae (British English)) are concerned respectively with childbirth and the female reproductive and associated organs. Reproductive medicine and fertility medicine are generally practiced by gynecological specialists.
- Pediatrics (AE) or paediatrics (BE) is devoted to the care of infants, children, and adolescents. Like internal medicine, there are many pediatric subspecialties for specific age ranges, organ systems, disease classes, and sites of care delivery.
- Pharmaceutical medicine is the medical scientific discipline concerned with the discovery, development, evaluation, registration, monitoring and medical aspects of marketing of medicines for the benefit of patients and public health.
- Physical medicine and rehabilitation (or physiatry) is concerned with functional improvement after injury, illness, or congenital disorders.
- Podiatric medicine is the study of, diagnosis, and medical and surgical treatment of disorders of the foot, ankle, lower limb, hip and lower back.
- Preventive medicine is the branch of medicine concerned with preventing disease.
  - Community health or public health is an aspect of health services concerned with threats to the overall health of a community based on population health analysis.
- Psychiatry is the branch of medicine concerned with the bio-psycho-social study of the etiology, diagnosis, treatment and prevention of cognitive, perceptual, emotional and behavioral disorders. Related fields include psychotherapy and clinical psychology.

=== Interdisciplinary fields ===
Some interdisciplinary sub-specialties of medicine include:

- Addiction medicine deals with the treatment of addiction.
- Aerospace medicine deals with medical problems related to flying and space travel.
- Biomedical Engineering is a field dealing with the application of engineering principles to medical practice.
- Clinical pharmacology is concerned with how systems of therapeutics interact with patients.
- Conservation medicine studies the relationship between human and non-human animal health, and environmental conditions. Also known as ecological medicine, environmental medicine, or medical geology.
- Disaster medicine deals with medical aspects of emergency preparedness, disaster mitigation and management.
- Diving medicine (or hyperbaric medicine) is the prevention and treatment of diving-related problems.
- Evolutionary medicine is a perspective on medicine derived through applying evolutionary theory.
- Forensic medicine deals with medical questions in legal context, such as determination of the time and cause of death, type of weapon used to inflict trauma, reconstruction of the facial features using remains of deceased (skull) thus aiding identification.
- Gender-based medicine studies the biological and physiological differences between the human sexes and how that affects differences in disease.
- Health informatics is a relatively recent field that deal with the application of computers and information technology to medicine.
- Hospice and Palliative Medicine is a relatively modern branch of clinical medicine that deals with pain and symptom relief and emotional support in patients with terminal illnesses including cancer and heart failure.
- Hospital medicine is the general medical care of hospitalized patients. Physicians whose primary professional focus is hospital medicine are called hospitalists in the United States and Canada. The term Most Responsible Physician (MRP) or attending physician is also used interchangeably to describe this role.
- Laser medicine involves the use of lasers in the diagnostics or treatment of various conditions.
- Many other health science fields, e.g. dietetics
- Medical ethics deals with ethical and moral principles that apply values and judgments to the practice of medicine.
- Medical humanities includes the humanities (literature, philosophy, ethics, history and religion), social science (anthropology, cultural studies, psychology, sociology), and the arts (literature, theater, film, and visual arts) and their application to medical education and practice.
- Nosokinetics is the science/subject of measuring and modelling the process of care in health and social care systems.
- Nosology is the classification of diseases for various purposes.
- Occupational medicine is the provision of health advice to organizations and individuals to ensure that the highest standards of health and safety at work can be achieved and maintained.
- Pain management (also called pain medicine, or algiatry) is the medical discipline concerned with the relief of pain.
- Pharmacogenomics is a form of individualized medicine.
- Podiatric medicine is the study of, diagnosis, and medical treatment of disorders of the foot, ankle, lower limb, hip and lower back.
- Sexual medicine is concerned with diagnosing, assessing and treating all disorders related to sexuality.
- Sports medicine deals with the treatment and prevention and rehabilitation of sports/exercise injuries such as muscle spasms, muscle tears, injuries to ligaments (ligament tears or ruptures) and their repair in athletes, amateur and professional.
- Therapeutics is the field, more commonly referenced in earlier periods of history, of the various remedies that can be used to treat disease and promote health.
- Travel medicine or emporiatrics deals with health problems of international travelers or travelers across highly different environments.
- Tropical medicine deals with the prevention and treatment of tropical diseases. It is studied separately in temperate climates where those diseases are quite unfamiliar to medical practitioners and their local clinical needs.
- Urgent care focuses on delivery of unscheduled, walk-in care outside of the hospital emergency department for injuries and illnesses that are not severe enough to require care in an emergency department. In some jurisdictions this function is combined with the emergency department.
- Veterinary medicine; veterinarians apply similar techniques as physicians to the care of non-human animals.
- Wilderness medicine entails the practice of medicine in the wild, where conventional medical facilities may not be available.

== Education and legal controls ==
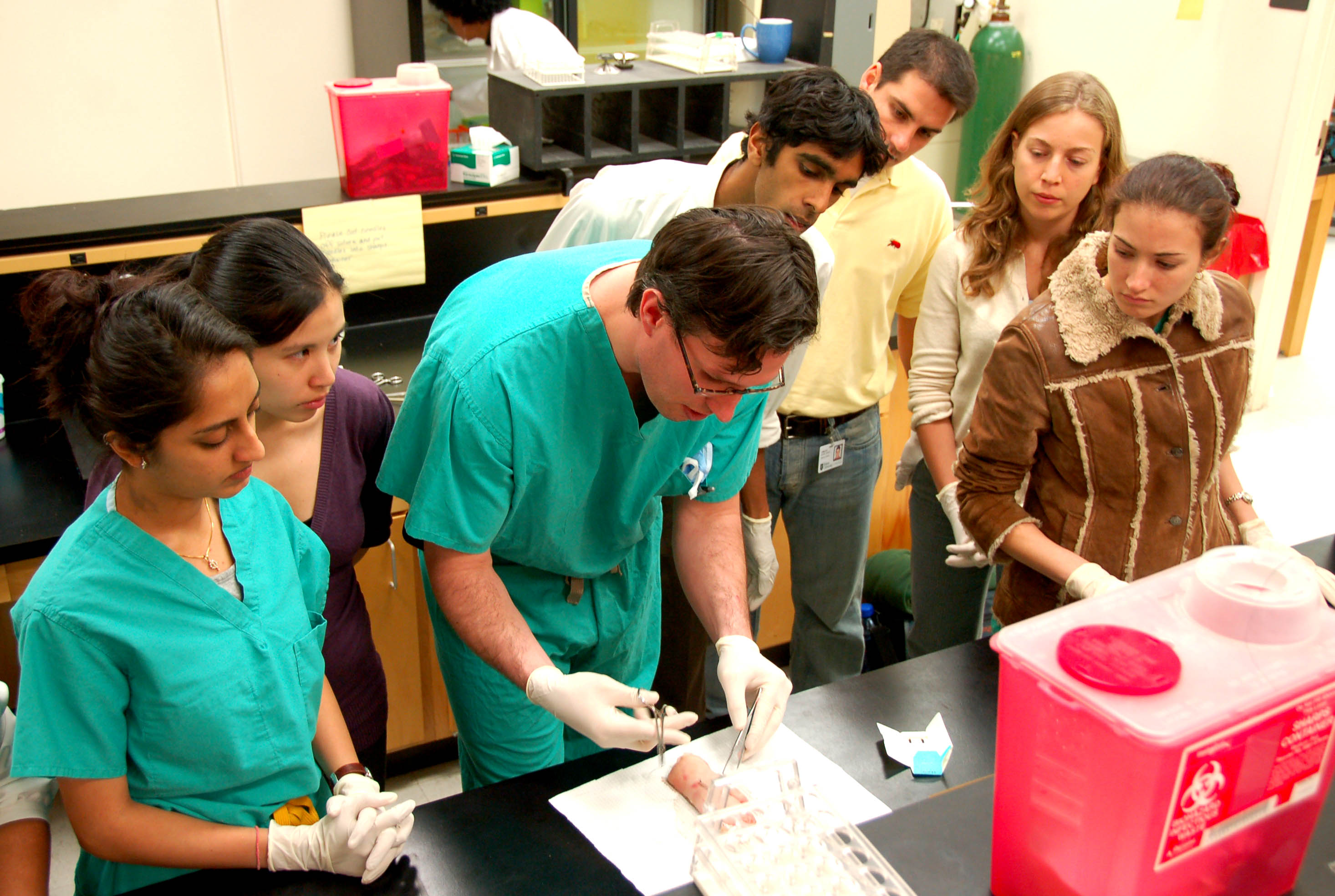
Medical students learning about stitches

Medical education and training varies around the world. It typically involves entry level education at a university medical school, followed by a period of supervised practice or internship, or residency. This can be followed by postgraduate vocational training. A variety of teaching methods have been employed in medical education, still itself a focus of active research. In Canada and the United States of America, a Doctor of Medicine degree, often abbreviated M.D., or a Doctor of Osteopathic Medicine degree, often abbreviated as D.O. and unique to the United States, must be completed in and delivered from a recognized university.

Since knowledge, techniques, and medical technology continue to evolve at a rapid rate, many regulatory authorities require continuing medical education. Medical practitioners upgrade their knowledge in various ways, including medical journals, seminars, conferences, and online programs. A database of objectives covering medical knowledge, as suggested by national societies across the United States, can be searched at http://data.medobjectives.marian.edu/.

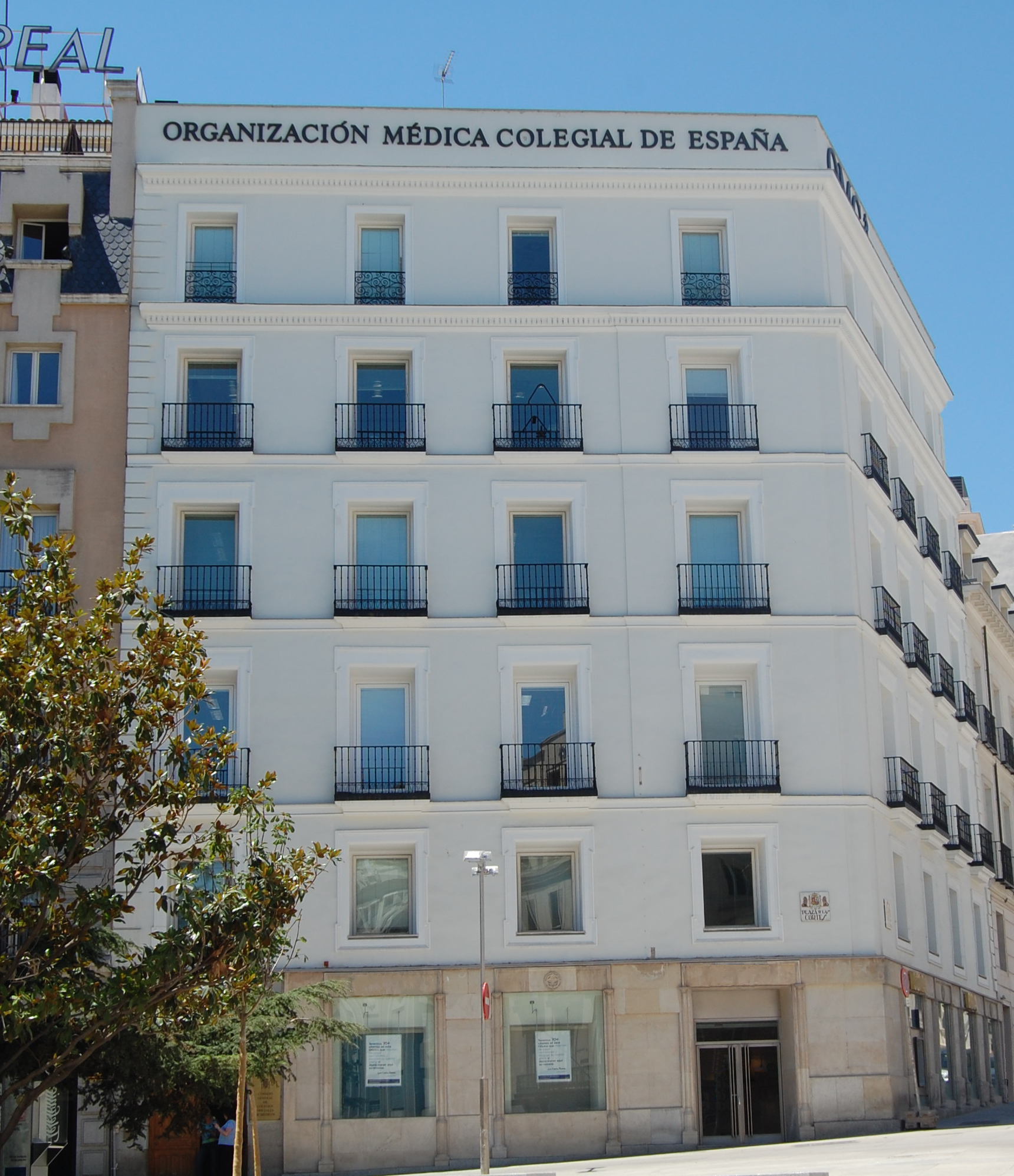
Headquarters of the Organización Médica Colegial de España, which regulates the medical profession in Spain

In most countries, it is a legal requirement for a medical doctor to be licensed or registered. In general, this entails a medical degree from a university and accreditation by a medical board or an equivalent national organization, which may ask the applicant to pass exams. This restricts the considerable legal authority of the medical profession to physicians that are trained and qualified by national standards. It is also intended as an assurance to patients and as a safeguard against charlatans that practice inadequate medicine for personal gain. While the laws generally require medical doctors to be trained in "evidence based", Western, or Hippocratic Medicine, they are not intended to discourage different paradigms of health.

In the European Union, the profession of doctor of medicine is regulated. A profession is said to be regulated when access and exercise is subject to the possession of a specific professional qualification. The regulated professions database contains a list of regulated professions for doctor of medicine in the EU member states, EEA countries and Switzerland. This list is covered by the Directive 2005/36/EC.

Doctors who are negligent or intentionally harmful in their care of patients can face charges of medical malpractice and be subject to civil, criminal, or professional sanctions.

== Medical ethics ==
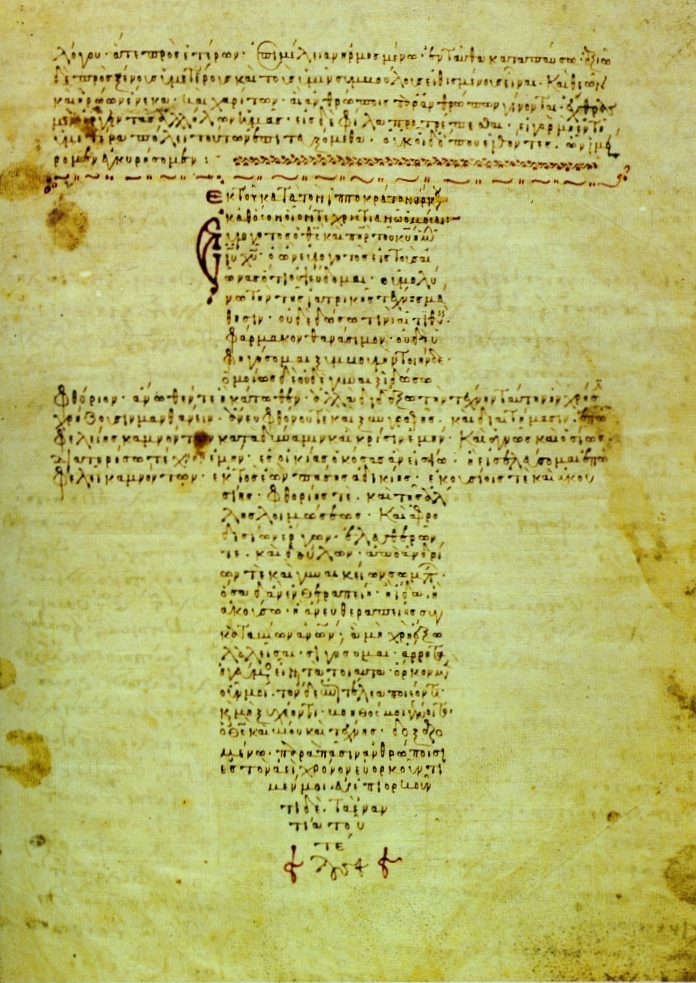
A 12th-century Byzantine manuscript of the Hippocratic Oath

Medical ethics is a system of moral principles that apply values and judgments to the practice of medicine. As a scholarly discipline, medical ethics encompasses its practical application in clinical settings as well as work on its history, philosophy, theology, and sociology. Six of the values that commonly apply to medical ethics discussions are:

- autonomy – the patient has the right to refuse or choose their treatment. (Latin: Voluntas aegroti suprema lex.)
- beneficence – a practitioner should act in the best interest of the patient. (Latin: Salus aegroti suprema lex.)
- justice – concerns the distribution of scarce health resources, and the decision of who gets what treatment (fairness and equality).
- non-maleficence – "first, do no harm" (Latin: primum non-nocere).
- respect for persons – the patient (and the person treating the patient) have the right to be treated with dignity.
- truthfulness and honesty – the concept of informed consent has increased in importance since the historical events of the Doctors' Trial of the Nuremberg trials, Tuskegee syphilis experiment, and others.

Such values do not give answers as to how to handle a particular situation, but provide a useful framework for understanding conflicts. When moral values are in conflict, the result may be an ethical dilemma or crisis. Sometimes, no good solution to a dilemma in medical ethics exists, and occasionally, the values of the medical community (i.e., the hospital and its staff) conflict with the values of the individual patient, family, or larger non-medical community. Conflicts can also arise between health care providers or among family members. For example, some argue that the principles of autonomy and beneficence clash when patients refuse blood transfusions, considering them life-saving; and truth-telling was not emphasized to a large extent before the HIV era.

== History ==
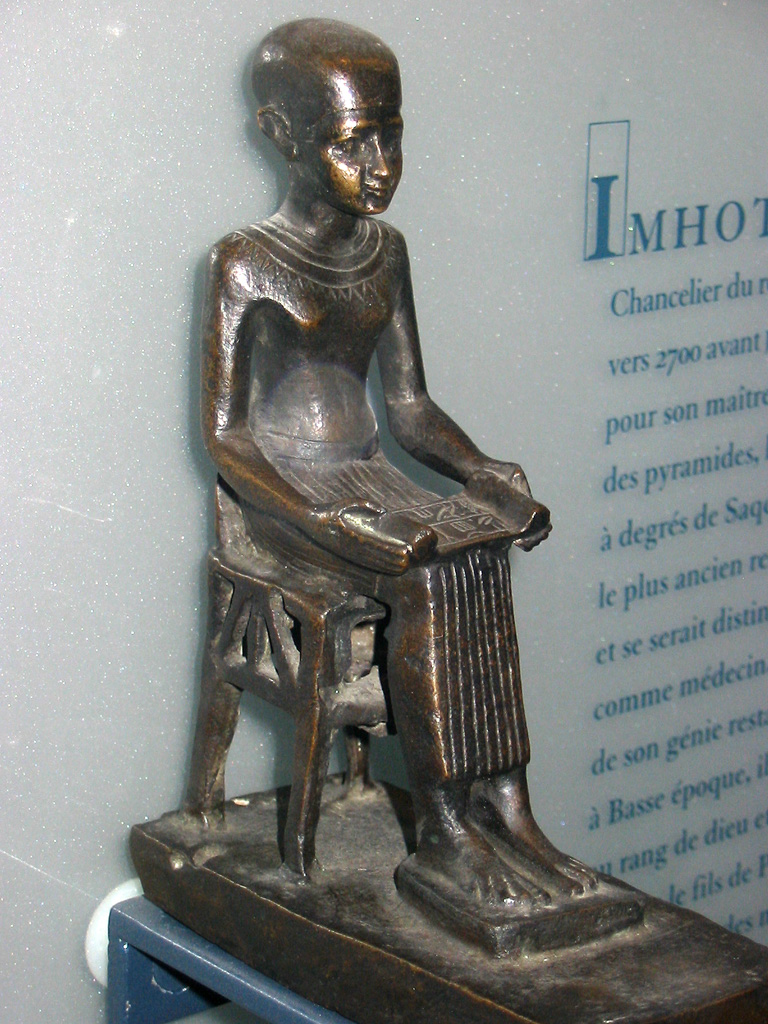
Statuette of ancient Egyptian physician Imhotep, the first physician from antiquity known by name

=== Ancient world ===
Prehistoric medicine incorporated plants (herbalism), animal parts, and minerals. In many cases these materials were used ritually as magical substances by priests, shamans, or medicine men. Well-known spiritual systems include animism (the notion of inanimate objects having spirits), spiritualism (an appeal to gods or communion with ancestor spirits); shamanism (the vesting of an individual with mystic powers); and divination (magically obtaining the truth). The field of medical anthropology examines the ways in which culture and society are organized around or impacted by issues of health, health care and related issues.

The earliest known medical texts in the world were found in the ancient Syrian city of Ebla and date back to 2500 BCE. Other early records on medicine have been discovered from ancient Egyptian medicine, Babylonian Medicine, Ayurvedic medicine (in the Indian subcontinent), classical Chinese medicine (Alternative medicine) predecessor to the modern traditional Chinese medicine), and ancient Greek medicine and Roman medicine.

In Egypt, Imhotep (3rd millennium BCE) is the first physician in history known by name. The oldest Egyptian medical text is the Kahun Gynaecological Papyrus from around 2000 BCE, which describes gynaecological diseases. The Edwin Smith Papyrus dating back to 1600 BCE is an early work on surgery, while the Ebers Papyrus dating back to 1500 BCE is akin to a textbook on medicine.

In China, archaeological evidence of medicine in Chinese dates back to the Bronze Age Shang dynasty, based on seeds for herbalism and tools presumed to have been used for surgery. The Huangdi Neijing, the progenitor of Chinese medicine, is a medical text written beginning in the 2nd century BCE and compiled in the 3rd century.

In India, the oldest known surgical text, the Sushruta Samhita written by the surgeon Sushruta, described numerous surgical operations, including the earliest forms of plastic surgery as well as methods of sterilization for surgical instruments. The earliest records of dedicated hospitals come from Mihintale in Sri Lanka where evidence of dedicated medicinal treatment facilities for patients are found.

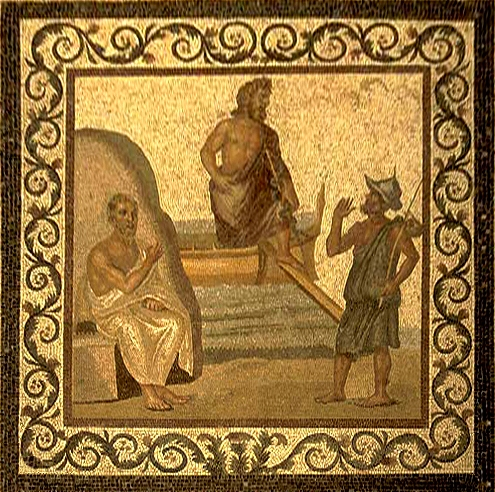
Mosaic on the floor of the Asclepieion of Kos, depicting Hippocrates, with Asklepius in the middle (2nd–3rd century)

In Greece, the ancient Greek physician Hippocrates, the "father of modern medicine", laid the foundation for a rational approach to medicine. Hippocrates introduced the Hippocratic Oath for physicians, which is still relevant and in use today, and was the first to categorize illnesses as acute, chronic, endemic and epidemic, and use terms such as, "exacerbation, relapse, resolution, crisis, paroxysm, peak, and convalescence". The Greek physician Galen was also one of the greatest surgeons of the ancient world and performed many audacious operations, including brain and eye surgeries. After the fall of the Western Roman Empire and the onset of the Early Middle Ages, the Greek tradition of medicine went into decline in Western Europe, although it continued uninterrupted in the Eastern Roman (Byzantine) Empire.

Most of our knowledge of ancient Hebrew medicine during the 1st millennium BC comes from the Torah, i.e. the Five Books of Moses, which contain various health related laws and rituals. The Hebrew contribution to the development of modern medicine started in the Byzantine Era, with the physician Asaph the Jew.

=== Middle Ages ===
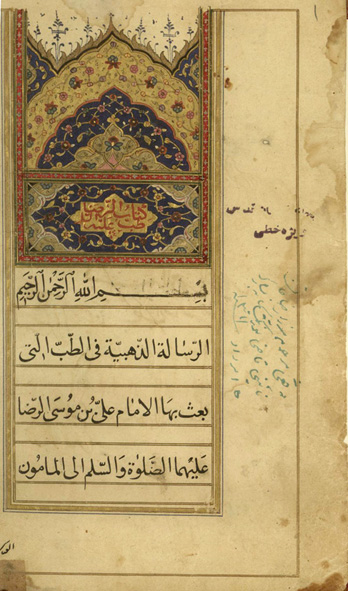
A manuscript of Al-Risalah al-Dhahabiah by Ali al-Ridha, the eighth Imam of Shia Muslims. The text says: "Golden dissertation in medicine which is sent by Imam Ali ibn Musa al-Ridha, peace be upon him, to al-Ma'mun."

The concept of hospital as institution to offer medical care and possibility of a cure for the patients due to the ideals of Christian charity, rather than just merely a place to die, appeared in the Byzantine Empire.

Although the concept of uroscopy was known to Galen, he did not see the importance of using it to localize the disease. It was under the Byzantines with physicians such of Theophilus Protospatharius that they realized the potential in uroscopy to determine disease in a time when no microscope or stethoscope existed. That practice eventually spread to the rest of Europe.

After 750 CE, the Muslim world had the works of Hippocrates, Galen and Sushruta translated into Arabic, and Islamic physicians engaged in some significant medical research. Notable Islamic medical pioneers include the Persian polymath, Avicenna, who, along with Imhotep and Hippocrates, has also been called the "father of medicine". He wrote The Canon of Medicine which became a standard medical text at many medieval European universities, considered one of the most famous books in the history of medicine. Others include Abulcasis, Avenzoar, Ibn al-Nafis, and Averroes. Persian physician Rhazes was one of the first to question the Greek theory of humorism, which nevertheless remained influential in both medieval Western and medieval Islamic medicine. Some volumes of Rhazes's work Al-Mansuri, namely "On Surgery" and "A General Book on Therapy", became part of the medical curriculum in European universities. Additionally, he has been described as a doctor's doctor, the father of pediatrics, and a pioneer of ophthalmology. For example, he was the first to recognize the reaction of the eye's pupil to light. The Persian Bimaristan hospitals were an early example of public hospitals.

In Europe, Charlemagne decreed that a hospital should be attached to each cathedral and monastery and the historian Geoffrey Blainey likened the activities of the Catholic Church in health care during the Middle Ages to an early version of a welfare state: "It conducted hospitals for the old and orphanages for the young; hospices for the sick of all ages; places for the lepers; and hostels or inns where pilgrims could buy a cheap bed and meal". It supplied food to the population during famine and distributed food to the poor. This welfare system the church funded through collecting taxes on a large scale and possessing large farmlands and estates. The Benedictine order was noted for setting up hospitals and infirmaries in their monasteries, growing medical herbs and becoming the chief medical care givers of their districts, as at the great Abbey of Cluny. The Church also established a network of cathedral schools and universities where medicine was studied. The Schola Medica Salernitana in Salerno, looking to the learning of Greek and Arab physicians, grew to be the finest medical school in medieval Europe.

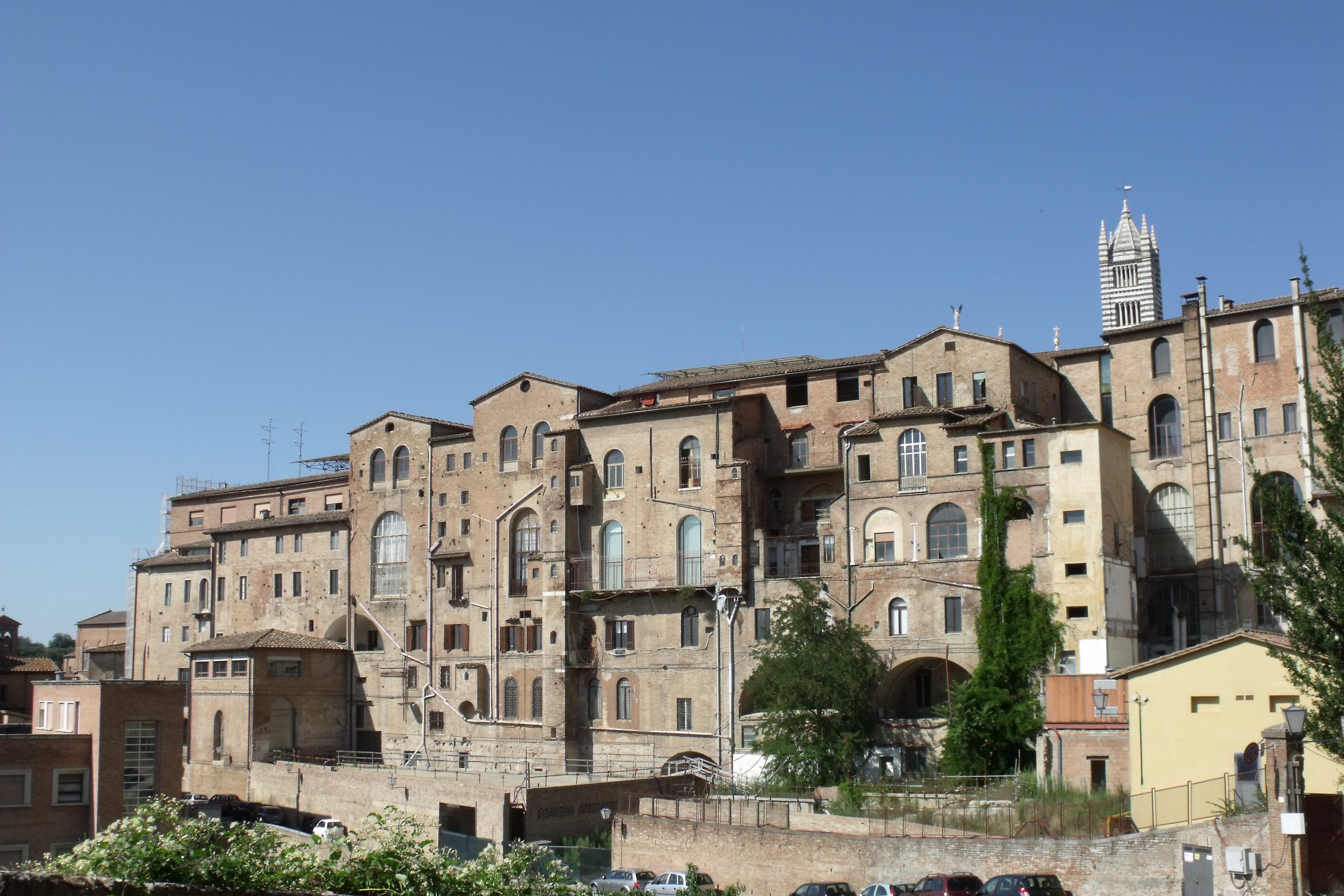
Siena's Santa Maria della Scala Hospital, one of Europe's oldest hospitals. During the Middle Ages, the Catholic Church established universities to revive the study of sciences, drawing on the learning of Greek and Arab physicians in the study of medicine.

However, the fourteenth and fifteenth century Black Death devastated both the Middle East and Europe, and it has even been argued that Western Europe was generally more effective in recovering from the pandemic than the Middle East. (Note: Michael Dols has shown that the Black Death was much more commonly believed by European authorities than by Middle Eastern authorities to be contagious; as a result, flight was more commonly counseled, and in urban Italy quarantines were organized on a much wider level than in urban Egypt or Syria.) In the early modern period, important early figures in medicine and anatomy emerged in Europe, including Gabriele Falloppio and William Harvey.

The major shift in medical thinking was the gradual rejection, especially during the Black Death in the 14th and 15th centuries, of what may be called the "traditional authority" approach to science and medicine. This was the notion that because some prominent person in the past said something must be so, then that was the way it was, and anything one observed to the contrary was an anomaly (which was paralleled by a similar shift in European society in general – see Copernicus's rejection of Ptolemy's theories on astronomy). Physicians like Vesalius improved upon or disproved some of the theories from the past. The main tomes used both by medicine students and expert physicians were De materia medica and Pharmacopoeia.

Andreas Vesalius was the author of De humani corporis fabrica, an important book on human anatomy. Bacteria and microorganisms were first observed with a microscope by Antonie van Leeuwenhoek in 1676, initiating the scientific field microbiology. Independently from Ibn al-Nafis, Michael Servetus rediscovered the pulmonary circulation, but this discovery did not reach the public because it was written down for the first time in the "Manuscript of Paris" in 1546, and later published in the theological work for which he paid with his life in 1553. Later this was described by Renaldus Columbus and Andrea Cesalpino. Herman Boerhaave is sometimes referred to as a "father of physiology" due to his exemplary teaching in Leiden and textbook 'Institutiones medicae' (1708). Pierre Fauchard has been called "the father of modern dentistry".

=== Modern ===
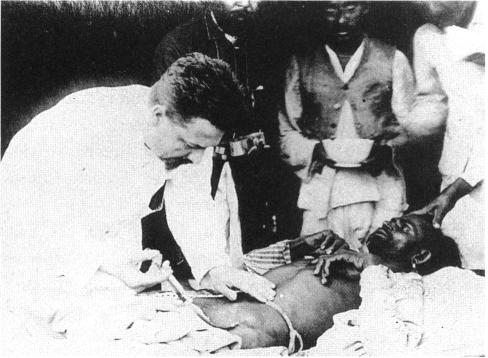
Paul-Louis Simond injecting a plague vaccine in Karachi, 1898

Veterinary medicine was, for the first time, truly separated from human medicine in 1761, when the French veterinarian Claude Bourgelat founded the world's first veterinary school in Lyon, France. Before this, medical doctors treated both humans and other animals.

Modern scientific biomedical research (where results are testable and reproducible) began to replace early Western traditions based on herbalism, the Greek "four humours" and other such pre-modern notions. The modern era really began with Edward Jenner's discovery of the smallpox vaccine at the end of the 18th century (inspired by the method of variolation originated in ancient China), Robert Koch's discoveries around 1880 of the transmission of disease by bacteria, and then the discovery of antibiotics around 1900.

The post-18th century modernity period brought more groundbreaking researchers from Europe. From Germany and Austria, doctors Rudolf Virchow, Wilhelm Conrad Röntgen, Karl Landsteiner and Otto Loewi made notable contributions. In the United Kingdom, Alexander Fleming, Joseph Lister, Francis Crick and Florence Nightingale are considered important. Spanish doctor Santiago Ramón y Cajal is considered the father of modern neuroscience.

From New Zealand and Australia came Maurice Wilkins, Howard Florey, and Frank Macfarlane Burnet.

Others that did significant work include William Williams Keen, William Coley, James D. Watson (United States); Salvador Luria (Italy); Alexandre Yersin (Switzerland); Kitasato Shibasaburō (Japan); Jean-Martin Charcot, Claude Bernard, Paul Broca (France); Adolfo Lutz (Brazil); Nikolai Korotkov (Russia); Sir William Osler (Canada); and Harvey Cushing (United States).

As science and technology developed, medicine became more reliant upon medications. Throughout history and in Europe right until the late 18th century, not only plant products were used as medicine, but also animal (including human) body parts and fluids. Pharmacology developed in part from herbalism and some drugs are still derived from plants (atropine, ephedrine, warfarin, aspirin, digoxin, vinca alkaloids, taxol, hyoscine, etc.). Vaccines were discovered by Edward Jenner and Louis Pasteur.

The first antibiotic was arsphenamine (Salvarsan) discovered by Paul Ehrlich in 1908 after he observed that bacteria took up toxic dyes that human cells did not. The first major class of antibiotics was the sulfa drugs, derived by German chemists originally from azo dyes.

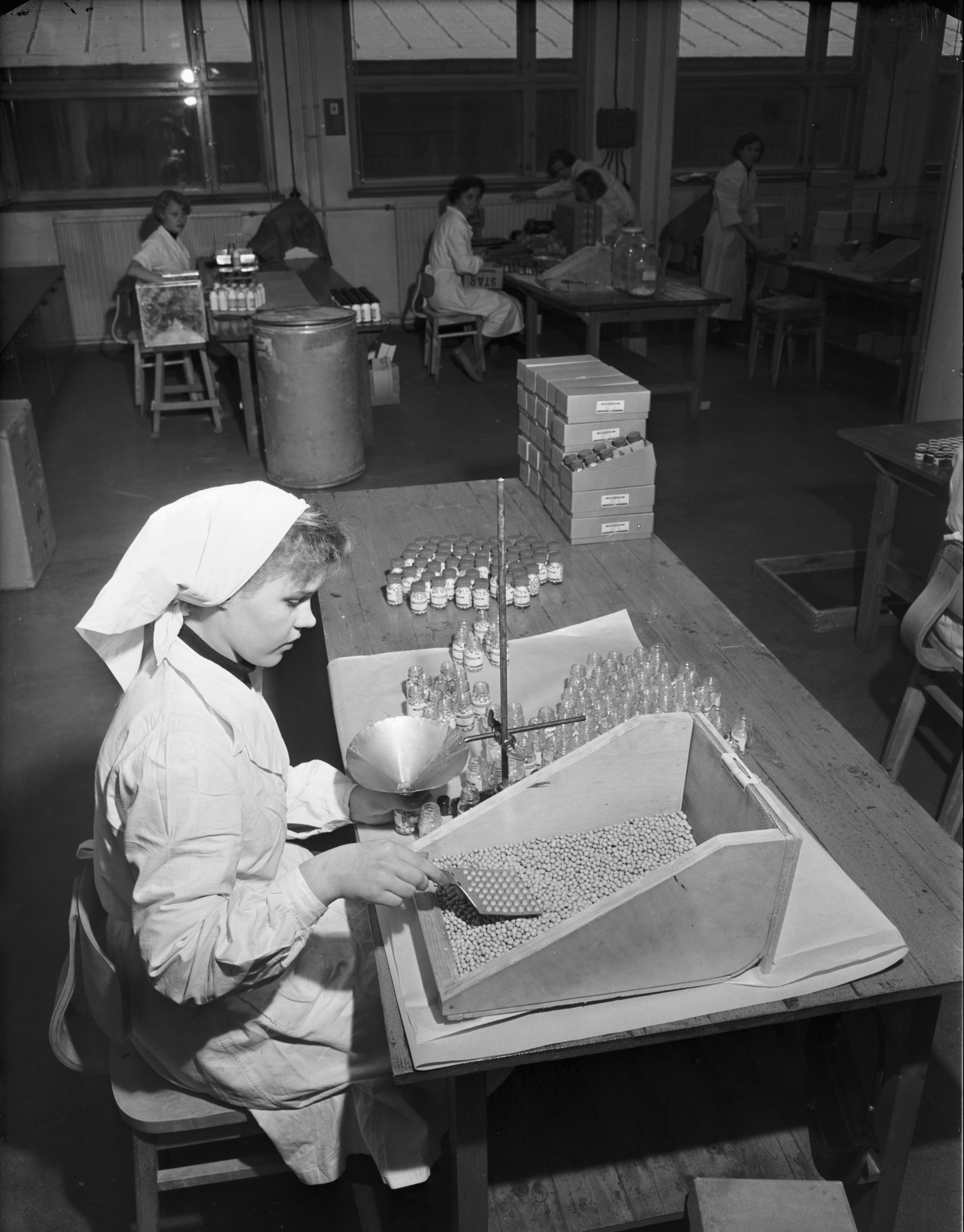
Packaging of cardiac medicine at the Star pharmaceutical factory in Tampere, Finland in 1953

Pharmacology has become increasingly sophisticated; modern biotechnology allows drugs targeted towards specific physiological processes to be developed, sometimes designed for compatibility with the body to reduce side-effects. Genomics and knowledge of human genetics and human evolution is having increasingly significant influence on medicine, as the causative genes of most monogenic genetic disorders have now been identified, and the development of techniques in molecular biology, evolution, and genetics are influencing medical technology, practice and decision-making.

Evidence-based medicine is a contemporary movement to establish the most effective algorithms of practice (ways of doing things) through the use of systematic reviews and meta-analysis. The movement is facilitated by modern global information science, which allows as much of the available evidence as possible to be collected and analyzed according to standard protocols that are then disseminated to healthcare providers. The Cochrane Collaboration leads this movement. A 2001 review of 160 Cochrane systematic reviews revealed that, according to two readers, 21.3% of the reviews concluded insufficient evidence, 20% concluded evidence of no effect, and 22.5% concluded positive effect.

== Quality, efficiency, and access ==
Evidence-based medicine, prevention of medical error (and other "iatrogenesis"), and avoidance of unnecessary health care are a priority in modern medical systems. These topics generate significant political and public policy attention, particularly in the United States where healthcare is regarded as excessively costly but population health metrics lag similar nations.

Health spending varies by country, which results in differences in access to care and access to medicines. Health care rationing varies by country. Most developed countries provide health care to all citizens, with a few exceptions such as the United States where restrictions on health insurance coverage may limit affordability.

== Telemedicine ==
Telemedicine (also Telehealth) refers to preventive, promotive, and curative care delivery, including remote clinical services, such as diagnosis, monitoring, administration and provider education. The main categories of telehealth:

- Telenursing is experiencing significant growth globally due to factors such as the need to reduce healthcare costs, an increasing aging and chronically ill population, and expanded healthcare coverage to distant, rural, small, or sparsely populated regions. Telenursing can help address nurse shortages, reduce travel time and distances, and minimize hospital admissions.
- Telepalliative care is a remote approach to optimising quality of life and relieving suffering for people with serious, complex and often fatal illnesses. The World Health Organization (WHO) recommends integrating palliative care as early as possible for any chronic and fatal illness. Telepalliative care typically utilizes telecommunication technologies like video conferencing, messaging for follow-ups, and digital symptom assessments through questionnaires that generate alerts for healthcare professionals.
- Telepharmacy involves delivering pharmaceutical care via telecommunications to patients in locations where direct contact with a pharmacist may not be possible or difficult.
- Telepsychiatry (telemental health) uses telecommunications technology to provide remote psychiatric care for individuals with mental health conditions.
- Telepsychology is the use of communication technology for the remote administration of psychological tests and psychotherapy.
- Teleneurotherapy utilizes computers and communications technology to deliver neurotherapy remotely. Research indicates that systematic physical stimuli from standard electronic devices, such as tablets with headphones, may treat injured nervous systems online by modulating neuronal plasticity. Evidence suggests that teleneurotherapy could enhance neurological treatment if it incorporates the therapeutic effect of a systematic abiotic impact of physical forces with key parameters of mother-fetus interaction. Recent research has shown therapeutic effects when implementing the APIN method in the online treatment of patients with various neurological conditions.
- Telenutrition refers to the use of video conferencing or telephony to provide online consultations by nutritionists or dieticians.
- Telerehabilitation (or e-rehabilitation) is the delivery of rehabilitation services over telecommunication networks and the Internet. Most services fall into two categories: clinical assessment (evaluating the patient's functional abilities in their environment) and clinical therapy.

== See also ==
- Alternative medicine – Unscientific healthcare practices
- List of causes of death by rate
- List of disorders
- List of important publications in medicine
- Lists of diseases
- Medical aid – Insurance covering health-related expenses
- Medical billing – Part of the US health system's reimbursement process
- Medical classification – Use of schemes of standardized codes
- Medical diagnosis
- Medical encyclopedia – Written compendium about diseases
- Medical equipment – Device to be used for medical purposes
- Medical ethics – System of moral principles of the practice of medicine
- Medical literature – Scientific literature of medicine
- Medical malpractice – Legal cause of action
- Medical psychology – Application of psychological principles to the practice of medicine
- Medical sociology – Branch of sociology
- Philosophy of healthcare – Branch of philosophy
- Quackery – Promotion of fraudulent or ignorant medical practices
- Telehealth
- Traditional medicine – Formalized folk medicine
- Zoopharmacognosy – Self-medication by animals
