= Social history (disambiguation) =

Social history is a field of history.

Social history may also refer to:

- Social history (medicine), a medical patient's social history as recorded by a hospital admission note
- Social History (journal), an academic journal
