= Family history (medicine) =

Medical information about a patient's relatives

Family history of haemophilia in the family of Queen Victoria

In medicine, a family history (FH or FHx) consists of information about disorders of direct blood relatives of the patient. Genealogy typically includes very little of the medical history of the family, but the medical history could be considered a specific subset of the total history of a family. Accurate knowledge of a patient's family history may identify a predisposition to developing certain illnesses, which can inform clinical decisions and allow effective management or even prevention of conditions.

== Eugenic origins and applications ==
Early mentions of family medical histories in medical literature date from the 1840s. Henry Ancell mentioned inquiring about the family history of a patient in a medical case study in 1842, noting that the patient's presenting concern appears to be present in relatives and remarking on the prolific reproduction of her female relatives. In 1849, W.H. Walshe argued in a lecture at University College London Hospital that in addition to a history of the presenting disease itself, a physician should also collect family history. Walshe's lecture does not define or justify the family history, which may suggest that taking one was already in common practice. However, later 19th-century physicians did provide a specific apologia for family histories and in some cases explicitly noted that they were not yet being taken routinely.

James Begbie argued that understanding the health of the entire family, including cousins, can help predict otherwise unpredictable illnesses that run in the family. Begbie's use of the family history for both predictive and normative evaluation of the family anticipated Francis Galton, who championed the routine family history as a eugenic strategy in his 1883 text, Inquiries into Human Faculty and Its Development. Galton writes:

"The investigation of human eugenics—that is, of the conditions under which men of a high type are produced—is at present extremely hampered by the want of full family histories, both medical and general, extending over three or four generations. There is no such difficulty in investigating animal eugenics, because the generations of horses, cattle, dogs, etc., are brief, and the breeder of any such stock lives long enough to acquire a large amount of experience from his own personal observation. A man, however, can rarely be familiar with more than two or three generations of his contemporaries before age has begun to check his powers; his working experience must therefore be chiefly based upon records. Believing, as I do, that human eugenics will become recognised before long as a study of the highest practical importance, it seems to me that no time ought to be lost in encouraging and directing a habit of compiling personal and family histories."

Galton argued in the early 1900s for the development of eugenic certification based on consulting these histories. Starting in the 1920s, family medical histories were used by government eugenics bodies to evaluate candidates for compulsory sterilization. Eugenics Boards such as the Eugenics Board of North Carolina also considered family medical histories for the issuance of eugenic certificates marking a candidate as fit for marriage and reproduction. The Disability History Museum includes a mock eugenic certificate from circa 1924 which was intended to be sent as a love note.

== Uses ==
Although sometimes neglected, many healthcare professionals glean information on family morbidity of particular diseases (e.g. cardiovascular diseases, autoimmune disorders, mental disorders, diabetes, cancer) to assess whether a person is at risk of developing similar problems.

Family histories may be imprecise because of various possible reasons:

- Adoption, fostering, illegitimacy, and adultery
- Lack of contact between close relatives
- Uncertainty about the relative's exact diagnosis
- In complex situations, a family tree or genogram may be used to organize the resulting information.

Some medical conditions are carried only by the female line such as X-linked conditions and some Mitochondrial diseases. Tracing female ancestors can be difficult in societies that change the woman's family name when she marries. Death records often give the maiden name of the deceased, and possibly also the deceased's mother's maiden name. Some of the most useful records for tracing women are wills and probate records.

Other medical conditions are carried only by the male line, though these Y-linked conditions are rare owing to the small size of the Y Chromosome. Tracing male ancestors may be impossible if the conception is due to rape or sexual activity outside of marriage.

Attaining the age when family members are diagnosed with a certain disease can also be helpful for screening purposes, like colon and breast cancer.

== Consequences ==
Not all positive family histories imply a genetic cause. If various members of the same family have been exposed to the same toxin, then they may develop similar symptoms without a genetic cause.

If a patient has a strong family history of a particular disorder (or group of disorders), this will generally lead to a lower threshold for investigating symptoms or initiating treatment. This is seen particularly in cardiac disease, where strong family history is considered a significant cardiovascular risk factor.

In diseases with a known hereditary component, many otherwise healthy people with a positive family history are tested early, with the aim of an early diagnosis and intervention to prevent the symptoms from developing. This has become accepted in hemochromatosis and various other disorders.

== Definitions ==
CMS required history elements
Type of history	CC	HPI	ROS	Past, family, and/or social
Problem focused	Required	Brief	N/A	N/A
Expanded problem focused	Required	Brief	Problem pertinent	N/A
Detailed	Required	Extended	Extended	Pertinent
Comprehensive	Required	Extended	Complete	Complete
