= Stanford Five =

Stanford Five in pain management is an augmented set of medical history obtained by the clinician during the medical interview for patients with pain. Unlike the OPQRST of pain history designed to elicit aspects of the pain experience itself, the Stanford Five is designed to assess and present the pain experience as viewed from the patient's primary belief system.

== Components ==
A cornerstone of interdisciplinary pain management, its creation is attributed to Sean Mackey of Stanford University. The following are the components of the Stanford Five:

- Cause: What tissue abnormalities the patient believes to be the cause of the current problem.
- Meaning: The presence of any sinister beliefs related to the pain, in terms of tissue damages, that precludes activities
- Goals: What the patient expects to achieve with further treatment
- Treatment: What the patient believes needs to be done now and in the future to help resolve the problem
- Impact: What impact does the primary problem have on the patient's life including interference on vocational, social, recreational activities, and in general the patient's quality of life
