= Review of systems =

Technique for eliciting medical history

A review of systems (ROS), also called a systems enquiry or systems review, is a technique used by healthcare providers for eliciting a medical history from a patient. It is often structured as a component of an admission note covering the organ systems, with a focus upon the subjective symptoms perceived by the patient (as opposed to the objective signs perceived by the clinician). Along with the physical examination, it can be particularly useful in identifying conditions that do not have precise diagnostic tests.

== Examples ==
Whatever system a specific condition may seem restricted to, it may be reasonable to review all the other systems in a comprehensive history. Different sources describe slightly different systems of organizing the organ systems. However, the following are examples of what can be included. Unspecified and other symptoms can't consider for both HPI and ROS:

There are 14 systems recognized by the Centers for Medicare and Medicaid Services:

System	Examples
Constitutional symptoms	weight loss, day sweats, fatigue/malaise/lethargy, sleeping pattern, appetite, fever, itch/rash, recent trauma, lumps/bumps/masses
Eyes	visual changes, headache, eye pain, double vision, scotomas (blind spots), floaters or "feeling like a curtain got pulled down" (retinal hemorrhage vs amaurosis fugax)
Ears, nose, mouth, and throat (ENT)	Runny nose, frequent nose bleeds (epistaxis), sinus pain, stuffy ears, ear pain, ringing in ears (tinnitus), gingival bleeding, toothache, sore throat, pain with swallowing (odynophagia)
Cardiovascular	chest pain, shortness of breath, exercise intolerance, PND, orthopnoea, oedema, palpitations, faintness, loss of consciousness, claudication
Respiratory	cough, sputum, wheeze, haemoptysis, shortness of breath, exercise intolerance
Gastrointestinal	abdominal pain, unintentional weight loss, difficulty swallowing (solids vs liquids), indigestion, bloating, cramping, loss of appetite, food avoidance, nausea/vomiting, diarrhea/constipation, inability to pass gas (obstipation), vomiting blood (haematemesis), bright red blood per rectum (BRBPR, hematochezia), foul smelling dark black tarry stools (melaena), dry heaves of the bowels (tenesmus)
Genitourinary	Urinary: Irritative vs Obstructive symptoms: Micturition – incontinence, dysuria, haematuria, nocturia, polyuria, hesitancy, terminal dribbling, decreased force of stream Genital: Vaginal – discharge, pain, Menses – frequency, regularity, heavy or light (ask about excessive use of pads/tampons, staining of clothes, clots always indicate heavy bleeding), duration, pain, first day of last menstrual period (LMP), gravida/para/abortus, menarche, menopause, contraception (if relevant), date of last smear test and result
Musculoskeletal	pain, misalignment, stiffness (morning vs day long; improves/worsens with activity), joint swelling, decreased range of motion, crepitus, functional deficit, arthritis
Integumentary/Breast	pruritus, rashes, stria, lesions, wounds, incisions, acanthosis nigricans, nodules, tumors, eczema, excessive dryness and/or discoloration. Breast pain, soreness, lumps, or discharge.
Neurological	Special senses – any changes in sight, smell, hearing and taste, seizures, faints, fits, funny turns, headache, pins and needles (paraesthesiae) or numbness, limb weakness, poor balance, speech problems, sphincter disturbance, cognitive and psychiatric symptoms
Psychiatric	depression, sleep patterns, anxiety, difficulty concentrating, body image, work and school performance, paranoia, anhedonia, lack of energy, episodes of mania, episodic change in personality, expansive personality, sexual or financial binges
Endocrine	Hyperthyroid: prefer cold weather, mood swings, sweaty, diarrhoea, oligomenorrhoea, weight loss despite increased appetite, tremor, palpitations, visual disturbances; Hypothyroid – prefer hot weather, slow, tired, depressed, thin hair, croaky voice, heavy periods, constipation, dry skin Diabetes: polydipsia, polyuria, polyphagia (constant hunger without weight gain is more typical for a type I diabetic than type II), symptoms of hypoglycemia such as dizziness, sweating, headache, hunger, tongue dysarticulation Adrenal: difficult to treat hypertension, chronic low blood pressure, orthostatic symptoms, darkening of skin in non-sun exposed places Reproductive (female): menarche, cycle duration and frequency, vaginal bleeding irregularities, use of birth control pills, changes in sexual arousal or libido Reproductive (male): difficulty with erection or sexual arousal, depression, lack of stamina/energy
Hematologic/lymphatic	anemia, purpura, petechia, results from routine hemolytic diseases screening, prolonged or excessive bleeding after dental extraction / injury, use of anticoagulant and antiplatelet drugs (including aspirin), family history of hemophilia, history of a blood transfusion, refused for blood donation
Allergic/immunologic	"Difficulty breathing" or "choking" (anaphylaxis) as a result of exposure to anything (and state what; e.g. "bee sting"). Swelling or pain at groin(s), axilla(e) or neck (swollen lymph nodes/glands), allergic response (rash/itch) to materials, foods, animals (e.g. cats); reaction to bee sting, unusual sneezing (in response to what), runny nose or itchy/teary eyes; food, medication or environmental allergy test(s) results.

The questions may be asked of the patient in a "head to toe" manner.

== Relationship to history ==
CMS required history elements
Type of history	CC	HPI	ROS	Past, family, and/or social
Problem focused	Required	Brief	N/A	N/A
Expanded problem focused	Required	Brief	Problem pertinent	N/A
Detailed	Required	Extended	Extended	Pertinent
Comprehensive	Required	Extended	Complete	Complete

For CMS, a "problem pertinent" ROS is limited to the problem(s) identified in the HPI; an "extended" ROS covers an additional 2 to 9 systems, and a "complete" ROS covers at least 10 additional systems. The chances of double dipping should be avoided while taking ROS from History. There are many rules and guidelines a coder must be aware of when it comes to appropriately selecting an Evaluation and Management (EM) code and avoiding doubling dipping is one of them.

This established patient has had a fever with sore/scratchy throat and severe headache for the past three days. He has had a little nausea but no vomiting. He said his pain is relieved with cold drinks and ibuprofen.

In the above example if you take throat as location in HPI, you cannot take sore/scratchy throat in ROS as ENT element. Most of the double dipping will happen in the ENT section since it is a combined system. There are some crossovers within the system, such as how the statement of "No known allergies" could also be calculated as part of the review of systems (ROS). The statement suggests the patient is not allergic to any medications, which is commonly part of the "past medical history" element.

The patient was brought up by an aunt; Patient having nasal problems for last 4 days, symptoms including runny nose / rhinorrhea. Denies cough, no fever, pneumonia, severe headache for the past three days.

In the above example, if you take Nose as location, you cannot take runny nose/rhinorrhea in ROS as an ENT element. Double dipping is against the rules. The common double dipping example (above) uses the elements of HPI (location and associated signs and symptoms) for both the HPI and the ROS. Double dipping may increase revenue by making it possible to qualify for a higher level of history and as such be considered fraud or abuse. There is a fine line between the signs and symptoms that a patient shares in the HPI and those obtained via the ROS. The ROS is a distinct review of systems. For example: if the documentation reads "'patient states that her hip has been painful' credit is not given in both the HPI 'location' and to the MSK (musculoskeletal) review of systems." It goes on to explain that if the patient's complaint is followed by "no other MSK issues", then it can be counted in the ROS as well as the HPI.
