= Social history (medicine) =

Part of patient history

In medicine, a social history (abbreviated "SocHx") is a portion of the medical history (and thus the admission note) addressing familial, occupational, and recreational aspects of the patient's personal life that have the potential to be clinically significant.

== Clinical significance ==
A patient's social history can give us information on their social situations and emotional behaviors that could be relevant to their health. Information like this can help us with occupation, education, living conditions, social support, even substance abuse, allowing us to go deeper into understanding. Social history can help different medical workers identify things that could affect a patient's health and also their circumstances when planning their care. The social history of medicine explores how Healthcare, medical practices, and beliefs about health and illness have developed through history. Florence Nightingale's highlights the importance of proper nursing care, cleanliness, ventilation, and the maintenance of healthy environment for patients .

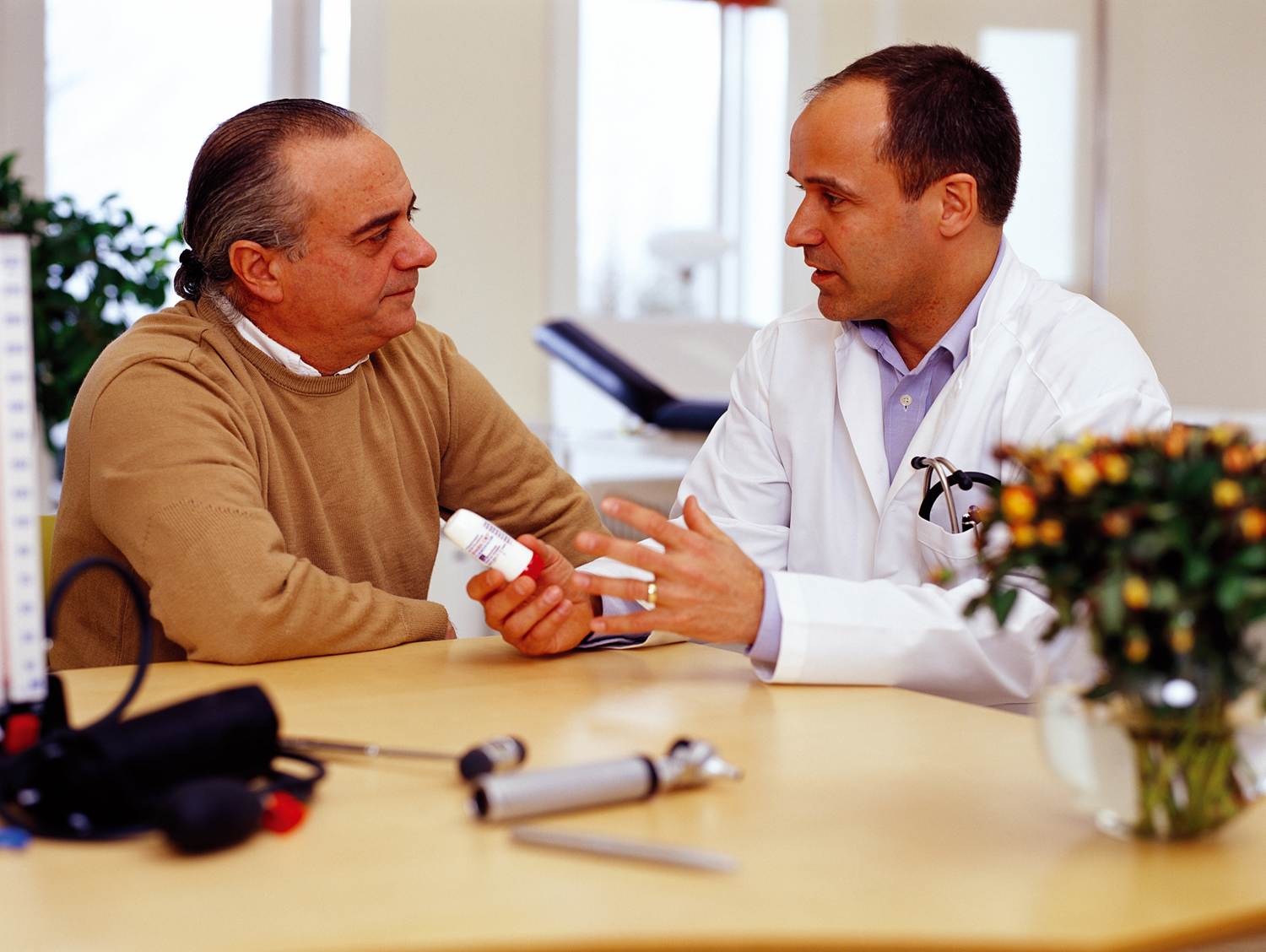

Social history information is gathered over time by medical interviews, where healthcare professionals ask a lot of personal questions about their life. Once they learn everything about the patient's history or information the better the patient's overall health will end up. .

== Historical background ==
The way we have collected social history overtime was the methods of interviews and written questionnaires. In 1961 2 men named James A. Kenny and Ronald C. Bounous both made a questionnaire for psychiatric patients. They made the argument that a personal interview wouldn't be possible with psychiatric patients instead a questionnaire would be better suited. Throughout the nineteenth century, people relied on different medical treatments and healing practices, and their healthcare decisions were often influenced by personal beliefs, social conditions, and access to medical professionals .Over time scientific advancements, including the development of penicillin and sulfonamide drugs and improvement in surgery, changed how diseases were treated and improve healthcare outcomes.

== Components ==
Components can include inquiries about:

- Substances
  - Alcohol
  - Tobacco (pack years)
  - illicit drugs
- occupation
- sexual behavior (increased risk of various infections among prostitutes, people who have sex with people for money, and males engaging in anal-receptive intercourse)
- prison (especially if tuberculosis needs to be ruled out)
- travel
- exercise
- diet
- Firearms in household (especially if children or persons with cognitive impairment are present)

== Relation to history ==
CMS required history elements
Type of history	CC	HPI	ROS	Past, family, and/or social
Problem focused	Required	Brief	N/A	N/A
Expanded problem focused	Required	Brief	Problem pertinent	N/A
Detailed	Required	Extended	Extended	Pertinent
Comprehensive	Required	Extended	Complete	Complete
