= Chief complaint =

Principal reason for a person seeking professional assistance

The chief complaint, formally known as CC in the medical field, or termed presenting complaint (PC) in Europe and Canada, forms the second step of medical history taking. It is sometimes also referred to as reason for encounter (RFE), presenting problem, problem on admission or reason for presenting. The chief complaint is a concise statement describing the symptom, problem, condition, diagnosis, physician-recommended return, or other reason for a medical encounter. In some instances, the nature of a patient's chief complaint may determine if services are covered by health insurance.

When obtaining the chief complaint, medical students are advised to use open-ended questions. Once the presenting problem is elucidated, a history of present illness can be done using acronyms such as SOCRATES or OPQRST to further analyze the severity, onset and nature of the presenting problem. The patient's initial comments to a physician, nurse, or other health care professionals are important for formulating differential diagnoses.

== Prevalence ==
The collection of chief complaint data may be useful in addressing public health issues. Certain complaints are more common in certain settings and among certain populations. Fatigue has been reported as one of the ten most common reasons for seeing a physician. In acute care settings, such as emergency rooms, reports of chest pain are among the most common chief complaints. The most common complaint in ERs has been reported to be abdominal pain. Among nursing home residents seeking treatment at ERs, respiratory symptoms, altered mental status, gastrointestinal symptoms, and falls are the most commonly reported.

CMS required history elements
Type of history	CC	HPI	ROS	Past, family, and/or social
Problem focused	Required	Brief	N/A	N/A
Expanded problem focused	Required	Brief	Problem pertinent	N/A
Detailed	Required	Extended	Extended	Pertinent
Comprehensive	Required	Extended	Complete	Complete

== See also ==
- Identified patient
- Medical history
