= History of the present illness =

Pertinent information surrounding a patient's history leading to a current illness

Following the chief complaint in medical history taking, a history of the present illness (abbreviated HPI) (termed history of presenting complaint (HPC) in the UK) refers to a detailed interview prompted by the chief complaint or presenting symptom (for example, pain).

== Questions to include ==
Different sources include different questions to be asked while conducting an HPI.

Several acronyms have been developed to categorize the appropriate questions to include.

The Centers for Medicare and Medicaid Services has published criteria for what constitutes a reimbursable HPI. A "brief HPI" constitutes one to three of these elements. An "extended HPI" includes four or more of these elements.

CMS	"OLDCARTS"	"OPQRST" or "PQRST"	"LOCATES"	"CLEARAST"	"LIQOR AAA"	"SCHOLAR" ("S" = Symptoms)	"COLDER AS"
location	"L": Location	"R": Region and Radiation	"L" : Location	"L": Location	"L": Location	"L:" Location	"L:" Location
quality	"C": Character	"Q": Quality of the pain	"C": Character	"C": Character	"Q": Quality	"C:" Characteristics	"C": Character
				"R": Radiation	"R": Radiation	see above	"R": Radiation
severity	"S": Severity-how disruptive	"S": Severity	"S": Severity	"S": Severity	"I": Intensity	see above	"S": Severity
duration	"O": Onset "D": Duration	"O": Onset	"T": Time	"T": Time frame	"O": Onset	"O:" Onset "H:" History	"D:" Duration
timing	"T:" Timing	"T": Time	see above	see above	see above	see above	"O": Onset
context			"E": Environment				
modifying factors	"A": Aggravating factors "R": Relieving factors	"P": Provocation or Palliation	"A" Alleviating/Aggravating Factors	"E": Exacerbation	"A": Aggravating factors	"A:" Aggravating factors	"E:" Exacerbation
				"A": Alleviation	"A": Alleviating factors	"R:" Remitting factors	"R:" Remitting factors
associated signs & symptoms			"O": Other symptoms	"A": associated symptoms	"A": Associated symptoms	see above	"A": Associated symptoms

Also usable is SOCRATES. For chronic pain, the Stanford Five may be assessed to understand the pain experience from the patient's primary belief system.

== See also ==
- Medical record
- Medical history
- Pain scale
