= List of medical mnemonics =

This is a list of mnemonics used in medicine and medical science, categorized and alphabetized. A mnemonic is any technique that assists the human memory with information retention or retrieval by making abstract or impersonal information more accessible and meaningful, and therefore easier to remember; many of them are acronyms or initialisms which reduce a lengthy set of terms to a single, easy-to-remember word or phrase.

== Mnemonics with wikipages ==
1. ABC — airway, breathing, and circulation
2. AEIOU-TIPS — causes of altered mental status
3. APGAR — a backronym for appearance, pulse, grimace, activity, respiration (used to assess newborn babies)
4. ASHICE — age, sex, history, injuries/illness, condition, ETA/extra information
5. FAST — face, arms, speech, time (stroke symptoms)
6. Hs and Ts — causes of cardiac arrest
7. IS PATH WARM? — suicide risk factors
8. OPQRST — onset, provocation, quality, region, severity, time (symptom checklist often used by first responders)
9. RICE — rest, ice, compression, elevation (generic treatment strategy for sprains and bruises)
10. RNCHAMPS — types of shock
11. RPM-30-2-Can Do — START triage criteria
12. SOCRATES — used to evaluate characteristics of pain
13. SOAP – a technique for writing medical records
14. SLUDGE — salivation, lacrimation, urination, defecation, gastric upset, and emesis (effects of nerve agent or organophosphate poisoning)

== Anaesthesiology ==
=== Anaesthesia machine/room check ===
MS MAID:

- Monitors (EKG, SpO2, EtCO2, etc.)
- Suction
- Machine check (according to ASA guidelines)
- Airway equipment (ETT, laryngoscope, oral/nasal airway)
- IV equipment
- Drugs (emergency, inductions, NMBs, etc.)

=== Endotracheal intubation: diagnosis of poor bilateral breath sounds after intubation ===
DOPE:

- Displaced (usually right mainstem, pyriform fossa, etc.)
- Obstruction (kinked or bitten tube, mucous plug, etc.)
- Pneumothorax (collapsed lung)
- Esophagus

=== General anaesthesia: equipment check prior to inducing ===
MALES:

- Masks
- Airways
- Laryngoscopes
- Endotracheal tubes
- Suction/Stylette, bougie

=== Spinal anaesthesia agents ===
"Little Boys Prefer Toys":

- Lidocaine
- Bupivacaine
- Procaine
- Tetracaine

=== Xylocaine: where not to use with epinephrine ===
The vasoconstrictive effects of xylocaine with epinephrine are helpful in providing hemostasis while suturing; however, they may also cause local ischemic necrosis in distal structures such as the digits, tip of nose, penis, ears, etc.

- "Ears, nose, hose, fingers, and toes"
- "Digital PEN"
  - Digits
  - Penis
  - Ear
  - Nose

== Behavioral science/psychology ==
=== Depression: major episode characteristics ===
SPACE DIGS:

- Sleep disruption
- Psychomotor retardation
- Appetite change
- Concentration loss
- Energy loss
- Depressed mood
- Interest wanes
- Guilt
- Suicidal tendencies

=== Depression: DSM-V criteria for major depressive disorder ===
"SIG E CAPS":

- Sleep disturbances
- Interest decreased (anhedonia)
- Guilt and/or feelings of worthlessness
- Energy decreased
- Concentration problems
- Appetite/weight changes
- Psychomotor agitation or retardation
- Suicidal ideation

=== Gain: primary vs. secondary vs. tertiary ===
- Primary: patient's psyche improved
- Secondary: symptom sympathy for patient
- Tertiary: therapist's gain

=== Kubler-Ross dying process: stages ===
"Death always brings great acceptance":

- Denial
- Anger
- Bargaining
- Grieving
- Acceptance

=== Middle adolescence (14–17 years): characteristics ===
HERO:

- Heterosexual/Homosexual crushes
- Education regarding short-term benefits
- Risk-taking
- Omnipotence

=== Narcolepsy: symptoms, epidemiology ===
CHAP:

- Cataplexy
- Hallucinations
- Attacks of sleep
- Paralysis on waking

Usual presentation is a young male, hence "chap"

=== Suicide: risk screening ===
SAD PERSONS scale:

- Sex (male – completion, female – attempt)
- Age (adolescent or elderly)
- Depression
- Previous attempt
- Ethanol abuse
- Rational thinking loss
- Social support problems
- Organised plan
- No spouse
- Sickness (chronic illness)

=== Sleep stages: features ===
Delta waves during Deepest sleep (stages 3 and 4, slow-wave)

dREaM during REM sleep

=== Impotence causes ===
PLANE:

- Psychogenic: performance anxiety
- Libido: decreased with androgen deficiency, drugs
- Autonomic neuropathy: impede blood flow redirection
- Nitric oxide deficiency: impaired synthesis, decreased blood pressure
- Erectile reserve: cannot maintain an erection

=== Male erectile dysfunction (MED): biological causes ===
MED:

- Medicines (propranolol, methyldopa, SSRIs, etc.)
- Ethanol
- Diabetes mellitus

=== Premature ejaculation: treatment ===
2 S's:

- SSRIs
- Squeezing technique (glans pressure before climax)

More detail with 2 more S's:

- Sensate-focus exercises (relieves anxiety)
- Stop and start method (5–6 rehearsals of stopping stimulation before climax)

== Biochemistry ==
=== B vitamin names ===
"The rhythm nearly proved contagious":

In increasing order:

- Thiamine (vitamin B1, also spelled thiamin)
- Riboflavin (vitamin B2)
- Niacin (vitamin B3, also called nicotinic acid)
- Pyridoxine (vitamin B6)
- Cobalamin (vitamin B12)

=== Essential amino acids ===
"TIM HALL PVT. (Ltd.) always argue and never (get) tire":

- Phe – phenylalanine
- Val – valine
- Thr – threonine
- Trp – tryptophan
- Ile – isoleucine
- Met – methionine
- His – histidine
- Arg – arginine
- Leu – leucine
- Lys – lysine
- Always argue: A is for Arg (Arginine) not Asp (Aspartic acid).
- 'Never tire': T is not Tyr (Tyrosine), but is both Thr (Theronine) and Trp (Tryptophan).

†Note that this initialism uses single letters for each amino acid that are not the same as the standard single-letter codes commonly used in molecular biology to uniquely specify each amino acid; for example, though phenylalanine is represented here by the letter "P", it is formally represented by the letter "F" in most other contexts, and "P" is instead used to formally represent proline.

=== Fasting state: branched-chain amino acids used by skeletal muscles ===
"Muscles LIVe fast":

- Leucine
- Isoleucine
- Valine

=== Fat-soluble vitamins ===
"The fat (fat-soluble vitamins) cat lives in the ADEK (vitamins A, D, E, and K) Or as fat soluble - ADEK = "All Dads Eat Kids" ."

=== Folate deficiency: causes ===
A FOLIC DROP:

- Alcoholism
- Folic acid antagonists
- Oral contraceptives
- Low dietary intake
- Infection with Giardia
- Celiac sprue
- Dilantin
- Relative folate deficiency
- Old
- Pregnant

=== Glycogen storage: Anderson's (IV) vs. Cori's (III) enzyme defect ===
ABCD:

- Anderson's = Branching enzyme
- Cori's = Debranching enzyme
- Otherwise, cannot really distinguish clinically.

=== Glycogen storage: names of types I through VI ===
"Viagra pills cause a major hardon tendency":

- Von Gierke's
- Pompe's
- Cori's
- Anderson's
- McArdle's
- Her's
- Tarui's

=== Enzyme classes ===
"'On The Hill, LIL' Transformers":

- 1 - Oxidoreductases
- 2 - Transferases
- 3 - Hydrolases
- 4 - Lyases
- 5 - Isomerases
- 6 - Ligases
- 7 - Translocases

== Critical care / intensive care ==
=== Daily patient checks: FAST-HUGS ===
FAST-HUGS is a mnemonic in critical care to ensure that essential aspects of patient management are reviewed daily.

- F — Feeding (nutritional support)
- A — Analgesia (pain control)
- S — Sedation (appropriate sedation levels)
- T — Thromboprophylaxis (prevention of venous thromboembolism)
- H — Head up (elevate the head of bed to reduce aspiration risk)
- U — Ulcer prophylaxis (prevent stress-related mucosal damage)
- G — Glucose control (maintain adequate blood glucose levels)
- S — Spontaneous breathing trial (assess readiness for ventilator weaning)

=== Vital signs: THROB-C ===
THROB-C is a mnemonic for vital signs in intensive care:

- T — Temperature
- H — Heart rate
- R — Respiratory rate
- O — Oxygen saturation
- B — Blood pressure
- C — Consciousness

== Emergency medicine ==
=== Acute LVF management ===
LMNOP:

- Lasix (furosemide)
- Morphine (diamorphine)
- Nitrates
- Oxygen (sit patient up)
- Pulmonary ventilation (if doing badly)

=== Atrial fibrillation: causes of new onset ===
THE ATRIAL FIBS:

- Thyroid
- Hypothermia
- Embolism (P.E.)
- Alcohol
- Trauma (cardiac contusion)
- Recent surgery (post CABG)
- Ischemia
- Atrial enlargement
- Lone or idiopathic
- Fever, anemia, high-output states
- Infarct
- Bad valves (mitral stenosis)
- Stimulants (cocaine, theo, amphet, caffeine)

=== Well's criteria ===
Secret little TIP (about) blood clots:

Signs/symptoms of PE (3)

PE is the most likely diagnosis (3)

Tachycardia >100bpm (1.5)

Iimmobilisation/surgery in the last 4 weeks (1.5)

Previous DVT/PE

Blood in sputum (haemoptysis) (1)

Active cancer (1)

Two tier score: PE likely > 4

=== Causes of life-threatening chest pain ===
PET-MAC

- P = Pulmonary embolism
- E = Esophageal rupture
- T = Tension pneumothorax
- M = Myocardial infarction
- A = Aortic dissection
- C = Cardiac tamponade

=== GCS intubation ===
Under 8, intubate.

=== Ipecac: contraindications ===
4 C's:

- Comatose
- Convulsing
- Corrosive
- hydrocarbon

=== JVP: raised JVP differential ===
PQRST(EKG waves):

- Pericardial effusion
- Quantity of fluid raised (fluid over load)
- Right heart failure
- Superior vena caval obstruction
- Tricuspid stenosis/tricuspid regurgitation/tamponade (cardiac)

=== MI: immediate treatment ===
DOGASH:

- Diamorphine
- Oxygen
- GTN spray
- Aspirin 300 mg
- Streptokinase
- Heparin

=== PEA/asystole (ACLS): cause ===
ITCHPAD

Infarction

Tension pneumothorax

Cardiac tamponade

Hypovolemia/hypothermia/hypo-,hyperkalemia/hypomagnesmia/hypoxemia

Pulmonary embolism

Acidosis

Drug overdose

=== Rapid sequence intubation (RSI) ===
SOAP ME

Suction

Oxygen

Airway equipment

Positioning

Monitoring & medications

EtCO2 & other equipment

Rapid sequence intubation medications (RSI) (CCRx)

Very calmly engage the respiratory system

Vecuronium 0.1 mg/kg

Cisatracurium 0.2 mg/kg

Etomidate 0.3 mg/kg

Rocuronium 0.6 mg/kg-1.2 mg/kg

Succinylcholine 1 mg/kg

=== Shock: signs and symptoms ===
TV SPARC CUBE:

Thirst

Vomitting

Sweating

Pulse weak

Anxious

Respirations shallow/rapid

Cool

Cyanotic

Unconscious

BP low

Eyes blank

=== Shock: types ===
RN CHAMPS (Alternatively: "MR. C.H. SNAP", or "NH CRAMPS"):

Respiratory

Neurogenic

Cardiogenic

Hemorrhagic

Anaphylactic

Metabolic

Psychogenic

Septic

=== Subarachnoid hemorrhage (SAH) causes ===
BATS:

Berry aneurysm

Arteriovenous malformation/adult polycystic kidney disease

Trauma

Stroke

=== Syncope causes, by system ===
HEAD HEART VESSELS:

CNS causes include HEAD:

Hypoxia/hypoglycemia

Epilepsy

Anxiety

Dysfunctional brain stem (basivertebral TIA)

Cardiac causes are HEART:

Heart attack

Embolism (PE)

Aortic obstruction (IHSS, AS or myxoma)

Rhythm disturbance, ventricular

Tachycardia

Vascular causes are VESSELS:

Vasovagal

Ectopic (reminds one of hypovolemia)

Situational

Subclavian steal

ENT (glossopharyngeal neuralgia)

Low systemic vascular resistance (Addison's, diabetic vascular neuropathy)

Sensitive carotid sinus

=== Tension pneumothorax: signs and symptoms ===
P-THORAX

Pleuritic pain

Tracheal deviation

Hyperresonance

Onset sudden

Reduced breath sounds (and dyspnea)

Absent fremitus

X-ray shows collapse

=== TWEED SASH ===
Non-pharmacological analgesia.

Non-Pharmacological Analgesic Strategies
Psychological Interventions
T	Therapeutic Touch (e.g. hand-holding)
W	Warn about painful interventions
E	Explain what is, or is about to, happen
E	Eye contact
D	Defend (patient) dignity
Physical Interventions
S	Stabilise fractures
A	Apply dressings to cover burns
S	Soft surface (avoid rigid spinal boards or stretchers)
H	Hypothermia avoidance

=== Ventricular fibrillation: treatment ===
Shock, shock, shock, everybody shock, little shock, big shock, momma shock, poppa shock:

Shock= Defibrillate

Everybody= Epinephrine

Little= Lidocaine

Big= Bretylium

Momma= MgSO_{4}

Poppa= Procainamide

=== Causes of fracture non-union ===
SPLINT

- Soft tissue interposition
- Position of reduction
- Location of fracture
- Infection
- Nutritional (damaged vessel/ diseased bone)
- Tumour (pathological fracture)

=== Classical signs of acute compartment syndrome ===
The 6 P's of comPartment syndrome:

1. Pain.
2. Paresthesia.
3. Poikilothermia.
4. Pallor.
5. Paralysis.
6. Pulselessness.

== Endocrine ==
=== Diabetes complications ===
KNIVES:

Kidney – nephropathy

Neuromuscular – peripheral neuropathy, mononeuritis, amyotrophy

Infective – UTIs, TB

Vascular – coronary/cerebrovascular/peripheral artery disease

Eye – cataracts, retinopathy

Skin – lipohypertrophy/lipoatrophy, necrobiosis lipoidica

== Hematology/oncology ==
=== Anterior mediastinal masses ===
4 T's:

Teratoma

Thymoma

Thyroid tissue

T-cell / Hodgkin's lymphoma

=== Dermatomyositis or polymyositis: risk of underlying malignancy ===
Risk is 30% at age 30. Risk is 40% at age 40, and so on.

=== Lung cancer: main sites for distant metastases ===
BLAB:

Bone

Liver

Adrenals

Brain

=== Bone metastases: cancers that frequently metastasize to the bone ===
BLT with a Kosher Pickle:

Breast

Lung

Thyroid

Kidney (Renal cell)

Prostate

=== Esophageal cancer: risk factors ===
ABCDEF:

Achalasia

Barret's esophagus

Corrosive esophagitis

Diverticuliis

Esophageal web

Familial

=== Lung cancer: notorious consequences ===
SPEECH:

Superior vena cava syndrome

Paralysis of diaphragm (phrenic nerve)

Ectopic hormones

Eaton-Lambert syndrome

Clubbing

Horner syndrome/ hoarseness

=== Mole: signs of trouble ===
ABCDE:

Asymmetry

Border irregular

Colour irregular

Diameter usually > 0.5 cm

Elevation irregular

=== Prognotic factors for cancer: general ===
PROGNOSIS:

Presentation (time & course)

Response to treatment

Old (bad prog.)

Good intervention (i.e. early)

Non-compliance with treatment

Order of differentiation (>1 cell type)

Stage of disease

Ill health

Spread (diffuse)

=== Pituitary endocrine functions often affected by pituitary-associated tumor ===
"Go look for the adenoma please":

Tropic hormones affected by growth tumor are:

GnRH

LSH

FSH

ACTH

Prolactin function

== Interviewing / physical exam ==
=== Abdominal assessment ===
To assess abdomen, palpate all 4 quadrants for DR. GERM:

Distension: liver problems, bowel obstruction

Rigidity (board like): bleeding

Guarding: muscular tension when touched

Evisceration/ ecchymosis

Rebound tenderness: infection

Masses

=== Altered level of consciousness: reasons ===
AEIOU TIPS

Alcohol

Epilepsy, electrolytes, and encephalopathy

Insulin

Overdose, oxygen

Underdose, uremia

Trauma, temperature

Infection

Psychogenic, poisons

Stroke, shock

=== Deep tendon reflexes (DTR's) ===
One two, put on my shoe - S1/2 roots for Achilles reflex (foot plantarflexion)

Three four, kick the door - L3/4 roots for patellar reflex (knee extension)

Five six, pick up sticks - C5/6 roots for brachioradialis and biceps brachii reflexes (elbow flexion)

Seven eight, shut the gate - C7/8 roots for triceps brachii reflex (elbow extension)

=== Causes of symptoms: OPQRST ===
OPQRST is a mnemonic used to assess symptoms in clinical settings, particularly in emergency medicine.

- O — Onset (when symptoms began)
- P — Provocation/palliation (factors that exacerbate or relieve symptoms)
- Q — Quality (description of the pain or discomfort)
- R — Region/radiation (location of pain and any radiation to other areas)
- S — Severity (intensity of the symptoms)
- T — Time (duration and progression of symptoms)

=== Fetal monitoring ===
VEAL CHOP

FHR Pattern:	Variable	Early deceleration	Acceleration	Late deceleration
Meaning:	Cord compression	Head compression	O2	Placental insufficiency

=== Neurovascular assessment ===
5 P's:

Pain

Pallor

Paresthesia

Pulse

Paralysis

=== Trauma assessment ===
DCAP-BTLS

Deformities & discolorations

Contusions

Abrasions & avulsion

Penetrations & punctures

Burns

Tenderness

Lacerations

Swelling & symmetry

BP-DOC

Bleeding

Pain

Deformities

Open wounds

Crepitus

=== Toxicological seizures: causes ===
OTIS CAMPBELL

Organophosphates

Tricyclic antidepressants

Isoniazid, insulin

Sympathomimetics

Camphor, cocaine

Amphetamines

Methylxanthines

PCP, propoxyphene, phenol, propranolol

Benzodiazepine withdrawal, botanicals

Ethanol withdrawal

Lithium, lidocaine

Lindane, lead

=== Vomiting: non-GIT differential ===
ABCDEFGHI:

Acute renal failure

Brain [increased ICP]

Cardiac [inferior MI]

DKA

Ears [labyrinthitis]

Foreign substances [paracetamol, theo, etc.]

Glaucoma

Hyperemesis gravidarum

Infection [pyelonephritis, meningitis]

=== Heart valve auscultation sites ===
"All patients take meds":

Reading from top left:

Aortic

Pulmonary

Tricuspid

Mitral

=== Glasgow coma scale: components and numbers ===
Scale types is 3 V's:

Visual response

Verbal response

Vibratory (motor) response Scale scores are 4,5,6:

Scale of 4: see so much more

Scale of 5: talking jive

Scale of 6: feels the pricks (if testing motor by pain withdrawal)

=== Mental state examination: stages in order ===
"Assessed mental state to be positively clinically unremarkable":

Appearance and behaviour [observe state, clothing...]

Mood [recent spirit]

Speech [rate, form, content]

Thinking [thoughts, perceptions]

Behavioural abnormalities

Perception abnormalities

Cognition [time, place, age...]

Understanding of condition [ideas, expectations, concerns]

=== History ===
SAMPLE history

Signs and symptoms

Allergies

Medications

Past medical history, injuries, illnesses

Last meal/intake

Events leading up to the injury and/or illness

OPQRST history

Onset of symptoms

Provocation/pallitive

Quality or character of pain

Region of pain or radiation

Signs, symptoms and severity

Time of onset, duration, intensity

=== Orthopaedic assessment ===
CLORIDE FPP

Character: sharp or dull pain

Location: region (joint) of origin

Onset: sudden vs. gradual

Radiation:

Intensity: how severe (scale 1–10), impact on ADLs (activities of daily living), is it getting better, worse or staying the same?

Duration: acute vs. chronic

Events associated: falls, morning stiffness, swelling, redness, joint clicking or locking, muscle cramps, muscle wasting, movement limitation, weakness, numbness or tingling, fever, chills, trauma (mechanism of injury), occupation activities, sports, repetitive movements

Frequency: intermittent vs. constant, have you ever had this pain before?

Palliative factors: is there anything that makes it better? (rest, activity, meds, heat, cold)

Provocative factors: is there anything that makes it worse? (rest, activity, etc.)

=== Pain history checklist ===
SOCRATES:

Site

Onset

Character

Radiation

Alleviating factors/ associated symptoms

Timing (duration, frequency)

Exacerbating factors

Severity

Alternatively, signs and symptoms with the 'S'

PLOTRADIO

Past history

Location

Onset/offset

Type/character (of pain)

Radiation

Aggravating/alleviating factors

Duration

Intensity

Other associated symptoms

=== Abdominal swelling causes ===
9 F's:

Fat

Feces

Fluid

Flatus

Fetus

Full-sized tumors

Full bladder

Fibroids

False pregnancy

=== Head trauma: rapid neuro exam ===
12 P's

Psychological (mental) status

Pupils: size, symmetry, reaction

Paired ocular movements

Papilloedema

Pressure (BP, increased ICP)

Pulse and rate

Paralysis, paresis

Pyramidal signs

Pin prick sensory response

Pee (incontinent)

Patellar reflex

Ptosis

=== Ocular bobbing vs. dipping ===
"Breakfast is fast, dinner is slow, both go down":

Bobbing is fast

Dipping is slow

In both, the initial movement is down.

=== Pupillary dilation (persistent): causes ===
3AM:

3rd nerve palsy

Anti-muscarinic eye drops (e.g. to facilitate fundoscopy)

Myotonic pupil

=== Clinical examination: initial Inspection of patient from end of bed ===
ABC:

Appearance (SOB, pain, etc.)

Behaviour

Connections (drips, inhalers, etc. connected to patient)

=== Differential diagnosis checklist ===
"A VITAMIN C"

Acquired

Vascular

Inflammatory (infectious and non-infectious)

Trauma/ toxins

Autoimmune

Metabolic

Idiopathic

Neoplastic

Congenital

=== Primitive reflexes ===
"Absent reflexes should get paediatrics professors mad"

Absent: asymmetrical tonic neck reflex

Reflexes: rooting reflex

Should: suck reflex

Get: grasp reflex

Paediatrics: placing reflex

Professors: parachute reflex

Mad: Moro reflex

=== Family history (FH) ===
BALD CHASM:

Blood pressure (high)

Arthritis

Lung disease

Diabetes

Cancer

Heart disease

Alcoholism

Stroke

Mental health disorders (depression, etc.)

=== Four point physical assessment of a disease ===
"I'm a people person"

Inspection

Auscultation

Percussion

Palpation

=== Medical history: disease checklist ===
MJ THREADS:

Myocardial infarction

Jaundice

Tuberculosis

Hypertension

Rheumatic fever/ rheumatoid arthritis

Epilepsy

Asthma

Diabetes

Strokes

=== Past medical history (PMH) ===
VAMP THIS:

Vices (tobacco, alcohol, other drugs, sexual risks)

Allergies

Medications

Preexisting medical conditions

Trauma

History of hospitalizations

Immunizations

Surgeries

SMASH FM:

Social history

Medical history

Allergies

Surgical history

Hospitalizations

Family history

Medications

=== Patient examination organization ===
SOAP:

Subjective: what the patient says.

Objective: what the examiner observes.

Assessment: what the examiner thinks is going on.

Plan: what they intend to do about it

=== Patient profile (PP) ===
LADDERS:

Living situation/ lifestyle

Anxiety

Depression

Daily activities (describe a typical day)

Environmental risks / exposure

Relationships

Support system / stress

=== Physical exam for 'lumps and bumps' ===
"6 students and 3 teachers go for CAMPFIRE":

Site, size, shape, surface, skin, scar

Tenderness, temperature, transillumination

Consistency

Attachment

Mobility

Pulsation

Fluctuation

Irreducibility

Regional lymph nodes

Edge

=== Short stature causes ===
RETARD HEIGHT:

Rickets

Endocrine (cretinism, hypopituitarism, Cushing's)

Turner syndrome

Achondroplasia

Respiratory(suppurative lung disease)

Down syndrome

Hereditary

Environmental (postirradiation, postinfectious)

IUGR

GI (malabsorption)

Heart (congenital heart disease)

Tilted backbone (scoliosis)

=== Sign vs. symptom ===
S&S:

Sign: I (the examiner) can detect attributes/reactions without patient description

Symptom: patient only can sense attributes/feelings

=== Social history ===
FED TACOS:

Food

Exercise

Drugs

Tobacco

Alcohol

Caffeine

Occupation

Sexual activity

=== Surgical sieve for diagnostic categories ===
INVESTIGATIONS:

Iatrogenic

Neoplastic

Vascular

Endocrine

Structural / mechanical

Traumatic

Inflammatory

Genetic / congenital

Autoimmune

Toxic

Infective

Old age / degenerative

Nutritional

Spontaneous / idiopathic

=== Surgical sieve for diagnostic categories (alternate) ===
PAST MIDNIGHT:

Psychological

Autoimmune

Spontaneous/idiopathic

Toxic

Metabolic

Inflammatory

Degenerative

Neoplastic

Infection

Genetic

Hematological

Traumatic

VITAMIN CDEF:

Vascular

Infective/inflammatory

Traumatic

Autoimmune

Metabolic

Iatrogenic/idiopathic

Neoplastic

Congenital

Degenerative/developmental

Endocrine/environmental

Functional

=== Breast history checklist ===
LMNOP:

Lump

Mammary changes

Nipple changes

Other symptoms

Patient risk factors

=== Delivering bad news ===
SPIKES:

Setting up

Perception

Invitation

Knowledge

Emotions

Strategy and summary

== Nephrology ==
=== Dialysis: Acute indications ===
AEIOU

Acidosis (refractory to treatment)

Electrolyte abnormalities (refractory to treatment, e.g. hyperkalemia)

Ingestions (e.g. methanol, ethylene glycol, lithium, salicylates)

Overload (volume overload refractory to IV diuresis)

Uremia (presenting with pericarditis, bleeding, encephalopathy)

== Neurology ==
=== Chorea: common causes ===
St. VITUS'S DANCE:

Sydenhams

Vascular

Increased RBC's (polycythemia)

Toxins: CO, Mg, Hg

Uremia

SLE

Senile chorea

Drugs

APLA syndrome

Neurodegenerative conditions: HD, neuroacanthocytosis, DRPLA

Conception related: pregnancy, OCP's

Endocrine: hyperthyroidism, hypo-, hyperglycemia

=== Congenital myopathy: features ===
DREAMS:

Dominantly inherited, mostly

Reflexes decreased

Enzymes normal

Apathetic floppy baby

Milestones delayed

Skeletal abnormalities

=== Dementia: reversible dementia causes ===
DEMENTIA:

Drugs/depression

Elderly

Multi-infarct/medication

Environmental

Nutritional

Toxins

Ischemia

Alcohol

=== Friedreich ataxia trinucleotide repeat ===
"Ataxic GAAit"

Guanine

Adenine

Adenine

=== Stroke risk factors ===
HEADS:

Hypertension/ hyperlipidemia

Elderly

Atrial fib

Diabetes mellitus/ drugs (cocaine)

Smoking/sex (male)

=== Horner syndrome ===
Horny PAMELA:

Ptosis

Anhydrosis

Miosis

Enophthalmos

Loss of ciliary-spinal reflex

Anisocoria

=== Cerebellar signs ===
DANISH:

- Dysdiadochokinesia / dysmetria
- Ataxia
- Nystagmus (horizontal)
- Intention tremor
- Slurred speech
- Hypotonia

=== Causes of pinpoint pupils ===
Pinpoint pupils are caused by opioids and pontine pathology

=== Diagnostic criteria of neurofibromatosis type 1 ===
CAFÉ SPOT:

- Café au lait spots
- Axillary + inguinal freckling
- Fibromas
- Eye: Lisch nodules
- Sphenoid dysplasia
- Positive family history
- Optic tumour (glioma)

=== Features of normal pressure hydrocephalus ===
Wet, wobbly, wacky:

- Wet = urinary incontinence
- Wobbly = ataxic gait
- Wacky = dementia

== Pathology ==
=== Gynaecomastia causing drugs ===
Some drugs create awesome knockers

Spironolactone

Digitalis

Cimetidine

Alcohol

Ketoconazole

== Psychiatry ==
=== Conduct disorder vs. antisocial personality disorder ===
Conduct disorder is seen in children. Antisocial personality disorder is seen in adults.

=== Depression: symptoms and signs (DSM-IV criteria) ===
AWESOME:

Affect flat

Weight change (loss or gain)

Energy, loss of

Sad feelings/ suicide thoughts or plans or attempts/ sexual inhibition/ sleep change (loss or excess) / social withdrawal

Others (guilt, loss of pleasure, hopeless)

Memory loss

Emotional blunting

=== Depression ===
UNHAPPINESS:

Understandable (such as bereavement, major stresses)

Neurotic (high anxiety personalities, negative parental upbringing, hypochondriasis)

Agitation (usually organic causes such as dementia)

Pseudodementia

Pain

Importuning (whingeing, complaining)

Nihilistic

Endogenous

Secondary (i.e. cancer at the head of the pancreas, bronchogenic cancer)

Syndromal

=== Delirium ===
DIMES & 3Ps:

Drugs (or withdrawal)

Infection (PUS = Pneumonia, UTI, Skin)

Metabolic (e.g. Na, Ca, TSH)

Environmental

Structural

Pain

Pee

Poo

I WATCH DEATH
Infections – PUS, CNS

Withdrawal – alcohol, sedatives, barbiturates

Acute metabolic changes – pH, hypo/hyper Na, Ca, acute liver or renal failure

Trauma – brain injury, subdural hematoma

CNS – post-ictal, stroke, tumour, brain mets

Hypoxia – CHF, anemia

Defficiencies – thiamine, niacin, B12 (e.g. chronic G and T alcoholics)

Endocrinopathies – hypo-/hyper-cortisol, hypoglycemia

Acute vascular – hypertensive encephalopathy, septic hypotension

Toxins and Drugs – especially anti-cholinergics, opioids, benzodiazepines

Heavy metals

PINCH ME

Pain

Infection

Nutrition

Constipation

Hydration

Medication

Electrolytes

=== Erikson's developmental stages ===
"The sad tale of Erikson Motors":

- The stages in order by age group:

Mr. Trust and MsTrust had an auto they were ashamed of. She took the initiative to find the guilty party. She found the industry was inferior. They were making cars with dents [identity] and rolling fuses [role confusion]. Mr. N.T. Macy [intimacy] isolated the problem, General TVT absorbed the cost. In the end, they found the tires were just gritty and the should have used de- spare!

=== Mental state examination ===
ASEPTIC:

Appearance

Speech

Emotion (objective/subjective)

Perceptions

Thoughts

Insight

Cognition

=== Mania: cardinal symptoms ===
DIG FAST:

Distractibility

Indiscretion (DSM-IV's "excessive involvement in pleasurable activities")

Grandiosity

Flight of ideas

Activity increase

Sleep deficit (decreased need for sleep)

Talkativeness (pressured speech)

=== Mania: diagnostic criteria ===
Must have 3 of MANIAC:

Mouth (pressure of speech)/ Mood

Activity increased

Naughty (disinhibition)

Insomnia

Attention (distractibility)

Confidence (grandiose ideas)

=== Parasomnias: time of onset ===
Sleep terrors and Sleepwalking occur during Slow-wave sleep (stages 3 & 4).Nightmare occurs during REM sleep (and is remembered).

=== Psychiatric review of symptoms ===
"Depressed patients seem anxious, so call psychiatrists":

Depression and other mood disorders (major depression, bipolar disorder, dysthymia)

Personality disorders (primarily borderline personality disorder)

Substance abuse disorders

Anxiety disorders (panic disorder with agoraphobia, obsessive-compulsive disorder)

Somatization disorder, eating disorders (these two disorders are combined because both involve disorders of bodily perception)

Cognitive disorders (dementia, delirium)

Psychotic disorders (schizophrenia, delusional disorder and psychosis accompanying depression, substance abuse or dementia)

=== Schizophrenia: negative features ===
4 A's:

Ambivalence

Affective incongruence

Associative loosening

Autism

=== Substance dependence: features (DSM IV) ===
WITHDraw IT:

- 3 of 7 within 12-month period:

Withdrawal

Interest or Important activities given up or reduced

Tolerance

Harm to physical and psychosocial known but continue to use

Desire to cut down, control

Intended time, amount exceeded

Time spent too much

== Radiology ==
=== Chest radiograph: checklist to examine ===
"Pamela found our rotation particularly exciting; very highly commended mainly 'cus she arouses":

Patient details

Film details

Objects (e.g. lines, electrodes)

Rotation

Penetration

Expansion

Vessels

Hila

Costophrenic angles

Mediastinum

Cardiothoracic ratio

Soft tissues and bones

Air (diaphragm, pneumothorax, subcut. emphysema)

=== Chest X-ray interpretation ===
Preliminary is ABCDEF:

AP or PA

Body position

Confirm name

Date

Exposure

Films for comparison

Analysis is ABCDEF:

Airways (hilar adenopathy or enlargement)

Breast shadows / bones (rib fractures, lytic bone lesions)

Cardiac silhoutte (cardiac enlargement) / costophrenic angles (pleural effusions)

Diaphragm (evidence of free air) / digestive tract

Edges (apices for fibrosis, pneumothorax, pleural thickening or plaques) / extrathoracic tissues

Fields (evidence of alveolar filling) / failure (alveolar air space disease with prominent vascularity with or without pleural effusions)

=== Chest X-ray: cavitating lesions differential ===
"If you see holes on chest X-ray, they are weird":

Wegener's granulomatosis (now known as granulomatosis with polyangiitis)

Embolic (pulmonary, septic)

Infection (anaerobes, pneumocystis, TB)

Rheumatoid (necrobiotic nodules)

Developmental cysts (sequestration)

Histiocytosis

Oncological

Lymphangioleiomyomatosis

Environmental, occupational

Sarcoid

Alternatively: L=Left atrial myxoma

=== Elbow ossification centers, in sequence ===
CRITOE:

Capitellum

Radial head

Internal epicondyle

Trochlea

Olecranon

External epicondyle

=== Head CT scan: evaluation checklist ===
"Blood can be very bad":

Blood

Cistern

Brain

Ventricles

Bone

=== Neck sagittal x-ray: examination checklist ===
ABCD:

Anterior: look for swelling

Bones: examine each bone for fractures

Cartilage: look for slipped discs

Dark spots: ensure not abnormally big, or could mean excess blood

=== Osteoarthritis: x-ray signs ===
LOSS:

Loss of joint space

Osteopyhtes

Subcondral sclerosis

Subchondral cysts

=== T2 vs. T1 MRI scan ===
"WW 2" (World War II):

Water is white in a T2 scan.

Conversely, a T1 scan shows fat as being whiter.

=== Upper lobe shadowing: causes ===
BREASTS:

Beryllium

Radiation

Extrinsic allergic alveolitis

Ankylosing spondylitis

Sarcoidosis

TB

Siliconiosis

== Respiratory ==
=== Airway assessment ===
LEMON

- Look
- Evaluate
- Mallampati
- Occlusion
- Neck mobility

PIPPA

- Position
- Inspection
- Palpation
- Percussion
- Auscultation

=== Asthma management ===
ASTHMA

- Adrenergic agonists
- Steroids
- Theophylline
- Hydration
- Masked oxygen
- Anticholinergics

=== COPD assessment test (CAT) ===
CAT items: CHEST SEA

To aid memory, think of the chest (or lungs) floating in a sea of yellow sputum, which is commonly seen in COPD.

- Cough
- Home-leaving confidence
- Exercise tolerance (uphill/ 1 flight of stairs)
- Sputum (phlegm/ mucus)
- Tightness of chest
- Sleep
- Energy level
- ADL at home

=== Croup symptoms ===
- 3 S's:
  - Stridor
  - Subglottic swelling
  - Seal-bark cough

=== Causes of upper zone pulmonary fibrosis ===
A TEA SHOP

- ABPA
- TB
- Extrinsic allergic alveolitis
- Ankylosing spondylitis
- Sarcoidosis
- Histiocytosis
- Occupational (silicosis, berylliosis)
- Pneumoconiosis (coal-worker's)

=== Features of a life-threatening asthma attack ===
A CHEST

- Arrhythmia/altered conscious level
- Cyanosis, PaCO2 normal
- Hypotension, hypoxia (PaO2<8kPa, SpO2 <92%)
- Exhaustion
- Silent chest
- Threatening PEF < 33% best or predicted (in those >5yrs old)

=== Pulmonary edema: treatment ===
LMNOP:

Lasix

Morphine

Nitro

Oxygen

Position/positive pressure ventilation

== Miscellaneous ==
The following may or may not fit properly into one of the above categories. They are being stored in this section either temporarily or permanently. Categorize them if needed.

=== Cholinergic crisis ===
SLUDGE and the Killer B's:

Salivation

Lacrimation

Urination

Diaphoresis, diarrhea

Gastrointestinal cramping

Emesis

Bradycardia

Bronchospasm

Bronchorrhea

also known as DUMBBELLS

Diarrhea

Urination

Miosis

Bradycardia

Bronchospasm

Emesis

Lacrimation

Loss of muscle strength

Salivation/sweating

=== Cheyne-Stokes breathing ===
Cheyne-Stokes breathing sounds like "chain smokes"

Drugs causing gynaecomastia: DISCO

- Digitalis
- Isoniazid
- Spironolactone
- Cimetidine / ketoconazole
- Oestrogen

=== Drugs for bradycardia and hypotension ===
Isoproterenol

Dopamine

Epinephrine

Atropine sulfate

=== Diaphragm innervation ===
C3, 4, 5 keeps the diaphragm alive

=== Intubation preparation ===
7 P's

Preparation

Preoxygenation

Pretreatment

Paralysis with induction

Positioning

Placement of tube

Postintubation management

=== Medications that may be administrated by the endotracheal tube ===
LEAN/NEAL

Lidocaine hydrochloride

Epinephrine

Atropine Sulfate

Naloxone hydrochloride

=== Pentad of TTP ===
FAT RN:

Fever

Anemia

Thrombocytopenia

Renal

Neuro changes

=== Systemic lupus erythematosus: diagnostic symptoms ===
SOAP BRAIN MD

Serositis

Oral ulcers

Arthritis

Photosensitivity, pulmonary fibrosis

Blood cells

Renal, Raynaud's

ANA

Immunologic (anti-Sm, anti-dsDNA)

Neuropsych

Malar rash

Discoid rash however, not in order of diagnostic importance.

=== Causes of carpal tunnel syndrome ===
MEDIAN TRAP

- Myxoedema
- Edema (heart failure, OCP, pre-menstrual)
- Diabetes mellitus
- Idiopathic
- Acromegaly
- Neoplasia
- Trauma
- Rheumatoid arthritis
- Amyloidosis
- Pregnancy

=== Carpal tunnel syndrome management ===
WRIST

- Wear splint at night
- Rest
- Inject steroids
- Surgical decompression
- Take diuretics
