= List of pathology mnemonics =

This is a list of pathology mnemonics, categorized and alphabetized. For mnemonics in other medical specialities, see this list of medical mnemonics.

== Acute intermittent porphyria: signs and symptoms ==
5 Ps:

Pain in the abdomen

Polyneuropathy

Psychological abnormalities

Pink urine

Precipitated by drugs (including barbiturates, oral contraceptives, and sulfa drugs)

== Acute ischemia: signs [especially limbs] ==
6 P's:

Pain

Pallor

Pulselessness

Paralysis

Paraesthesia

Perishingly cold

== Anemia (normocytic): causes ==
ABCD:

Acute blood loss

Bone marrow failure

Chronic disease

Destruction (hemolysis)

== Anemia causes (simplified) ==
ANEMIA:

Anemia of chronic disease

No folate or B12

Ethanol

Marrow failure & hemaglobinopathies

Iron deficient

Acute & chronic blood loss

== Atherosclerosis risk factors ==
"You're a SAD BET with these risk factors":

Sex: male

Age: middle-aged, elderly

Diabetes mellitus

BP high: hypertension

Elevated cholesterol

Tobacco

== Carcinoid syndrome: components ==
CARCinoid:

Cutaneous flushing

Asthmatic wheezing

Right sided valvular heart lesions

Cramping and diarrhea

== Cushing syndrome ==
CUSHING:

Central obesity/ Cervical fat pads/ Collagen fiber weakness/ Comedones (acne)

Urinary free corisol and glucose increase

Striae/ Suppressed immunity

Hypercortisolism/ Hypertension/ Hyperglycemia/ Hirsutism

Iatrogenic (Increased administration of corticosteroids)

Noniatrogenic (Neoplasms)

Glucose intolerance/Growth retardation

== Diabetic ketoacidosis: I vs. II ==
ketONEbodies are seen in type ONEdiabetes.

== Gallstones: risk factors ==
5 F's:

Fat

Female

Fair (gallstones more common in Caucasians)

Fertile (premenopausal- increased estrogen is thought to increase cholesterol levels in bile and decrease gallbladder contractions)

Forty or above (age)

== Hepatomegaly: 3 common causes, 3 rarer causes ==
Common are 3 C's:

Cirrhosis

Carcinoma

Cardiac failure

Rarer are 3 C's:

Cholestasis

Cysts

Cellular infiltration

== Hyperkalemia (signs and symptoms) ==
MURDER

Muscle weakness

Urine: oliguria, anuria

Respiratory distress

Decreased cardiac contractility

EKG changes (peaked T waves; QRS widening)

Reflexes: Hyperreflexia or areflexia (flaccid)

== Hypernatremia (signs and symptoms) ==
FRIED SALT

FRIED

Fever (low), Flushed skin

Restless (irritable)

Increased fluid retention, Increased blood pressure

Edema (peripheral and pitting)

Decreased urinary output, Dry mouth

SALT

Skin flushed

Agitated

Low-grade fever

Thirst

== Inflammatory Bowel Disease: which has cobblestones ==
Crohn's has Cobblestones on endoscopy.

== Morphine: effects ==
MORPHINES:

Miosis

Orthostatic hypotension or "Out of it"

Respiratory depression

Pain suppression or Pneumonia

Histamine release or Hormonal alterations or Hypotension

Increased ICT or Infrequency (constipation, or urinary retention)

Nausea

Euphoria or Emesis

Sedation

== Kwashiorkor: distinguishing from Marasmus ==
FLAME:

Fatty

Liver

Anemia

Malabsorption

Edema

== Pancreatitis: causes ==
I GET SMASHED:

Idiopathic/Infection/Ischaemic

Gallstones

Ethanol

Trauma

Steroids/surgery

Mumps/malnutrition/mechanical obstruction/metabolic

Autoimmune : Vasculitis

Scorpion sting

Hyperlipidaemia/hypercalcaemia/hereditary/hyperparathyroidism/hypermagnesemia

ERCP

Drugs : Isoniazid, Thiazides, Azathioprine, Valproic Acid, Estrogen

== PKU findings ==
PKU:

Pale hair, skin

Krazy (neurological abnormalities)

Unpleasant smell

== Pupils in overdose: morphine vs. amphetamine ==
"MorPHINE:Fine. AmPHETamine:Fat":

Morphine overdose: pupils constricted (fine).

Amphetamine overdose: pupils dilated (fat).

== Pericarditis findings ==
PERICarditis:

Pulsus paradoxus

ECG changes

Rub

Increased JVP

Chest pain [worse on inspiration, better when leaning forward]

== Gout vs. pseudogout: crystal lab findings ==
P seudogout crystals are:

P ositive birefringent

P olygon shaped

Gout therefore is the negative needle shaped crystals. Also, gout classically strikes the great Toe, and its hallmark is Tophi.

== Signs of Chronic Liver Disease ==
abcdefghij

Asterixis, Ascites, Ankle oedema, Atrophy of testicles

Bruising

Clubbing/ Colour change of nails (leuconychia)

Dupuytren’s contracture

Encephalopathy / palmar Erythema

Foetor hepaticus

Gynaecomastia

Hepatomegaly

Increase size of parotids

Jaundice
