= PQRST =

PQRST are the sixteenth through twentieth letters of the ISO basic Latin alphabet and may refer to that alphabet as a whole.

PQRST may refer to:

- The PQRST method, a method of studying
- OPQRST, a mnemonic initialism used by persons performing first aid, omitting O for Onset of the event
- The part of the Alphabet song
- One complete heartbeat in the ECG (P-wave, QRS complex, T-wave)
