= Medical record librarian =

Obsolete occupation

A medical record librarian was a librarian of medical records maintaining a diseases and operation index, patient index, and physician index. Medical record librarians also assisted in public health reporting.

The occupation has been made obsolete with the advent of electronic health records.

== United States ==
In the United States, the profession began in the 1920s.
