= Akido (company) =

Akido Inc.
- Type: Private
- Industry: Healthcare technology
- Founded: 2015; 11 years ago
- Founder: Prashant Samant; Jared Goodner; Sanjit Mahanti
- Headquarters: Bradbury Building, 834 S Broadway, #300, Los Angeles, CA 90014
- Key people: Prashant Samant (CEO); Jared Goodner (CTO); Sanjit Mahanti (CBDO)
- Website: www.akido.com

Akido Inc. (previously Akido Labs Inc.) is an American healthcare technology company located in Los Angeles, California. Akido develops intelligence software for clinical care and runs a network of healthcare services. Akido’s products include ScopeAI, a clinical support system that helps with patient interviews, medical assessments, and treatment recommendations.

== History ==
Akido was founded in 2015. It grew out of research linked to the University of Southern California's Digital Health Lab. At first, Akido made data and software tools for healthcare providers and public‑service organizations. These tools were meant to spot people at risk of adverse health or social outcomes.

In 2022, Akido turned to directly providing healthcare services by acquiring Chaparral Medical Group located in Southern California. Through this acquisition, Akido built a healthcare network that combines direct healthcare services with its own technology.

In December 2023, Akido expanded its operations to the East Coast through a joint venture with the Rhode Island Primary Care Physicians Corporation (RIPCPC), establishing an AI-supported primary care network across Rhode Island.

In March 2025, Akido launched a healthcare initiative in New York City to deploy ScopeAI-supported mobile clinics and chronic disease management programs for rideshare drivers, including Uber and Lyft operators.

In May 2025, Akido announced a $60 million Series B funding round led by Oak HC/FT. Akido said this funding would help expand ScopeAI and Akido’s clinical network.

In July 2026, Akido announced it had dropped "Labs" from its company name because it has moved past the R&D phase and would expand its AI‑supported healthcare model under the Akido and Akido Medical brands.

== Products and services ==
=== ScopeAI ===
ScopeAI is a clinical artificial intelligence system created by Akido. It guides patient interviews, suggests follow‑up questions, organizes information, and produces proposed diagnoses, tests, and treatments for a licensed clinician to review. The Wall Street Journal reported that physicians retain the authority to approve, change, or reject ScopeAI’s recommendations.

Akido has deployed ScopeAI in clinical settings, such as conventional clinics, street medicine programs, and services for underserved populations.

=== Healthcare services ===
Akido operates healthcare services that integrate with its proprietary technology. Akido’s programs have included street medicine initiatives for individuals experiencing homelessness as well as partnerships with community organizations. In January 2026, CalMatters reported on ScopeAI’s use in street medicine programs across California, highlighting how ScopeAI helped outreach workers collect information for later physician review.

== Reception and concerns ==
Supporters of AI‑assisted care contend that these systems enable clinicians to treat more patients and expand access to care in medically underserved communities. Akido’s partnerships have targeted groups including people experiencing homelessness and workers with limited healthcare access.

However, the application of AI in diagnosis and treatment has raised questions regarding accuracy, privacy, bias, consent, and the standard of care for vulnerable populations. In its 2026 report, CalMatters noted concerns from healthcare and AI researchers regarding the risks of deploying AI tools with unhoused individuals, emphasizing the need for robust human oversight and safety protocols.

== See also ==
- Artificial intelligence in healthcare
