= Clerkship =

Clerkship may refer to:

Law

- Law clerk - a law student or recent law graduate who practices law under the guidance of a judge or licensed attorney.
- A court clerk is an officer of the court whose responsibilities include maintaining records of a court and administering oaths to witnesses, jurors, and grand jurors as well as performing some quasi-secretarial duties.

Medicine

- Clinical clerkship - a period of medical education in which students (medical, nursing, dental, or otherwise) – practice medicine under the supervision of a health practitioner. Especially clinical training for physicians in training during the second half of medical school.
