= Lawrence Weed =

American physician

- Born: December 26, 1923; Troy, New York, U.S.
- Died: June 3, 2017 (aged 93); Underhill, Vermont, U.S.
- Education: Hamilton College (New York); Columbia University College of Physicians and Surgeons
- Occupations: Physician, researcher, educator, author
- Spouse: Laura Brooks (m. 1952; died 1997)
- Children: 5

Lawrence Leonard Weed (December 26, 1923 – June 3, 2017) was an American physician, researcher, educator, entrepreneur, and author, who is best known for creating the problem-oriented medical record as well as one of the first electronic health records.

== Biography ==
Born in Troy, New York, he graduated from Hamilton College and, later, the Columbia University College of Physicians and Surgeons in 1947 and pursued a career in academic medicine. He retired as an Emeritus Professor of the University of Vermont.

== Career ==
Dividing his time between research, patient care, and teaching, he developed a method that reorganized the structure of the medical record from being divided into the different sources for patient records (x-rays, prescriptions, physician notes) to one structured around a well-defined list of a patient's medical problems.

In the early 1950s, while a professor of medicine and pharmacology at Yale School of Medicine, Dr. Weed was known to accompany students in the hospital where he observed them struggling to interpret unstructured patient notes written by doctors. In response, he created the problem-oriented medical record (POMR), a method for documenting patient information. He first published about the problem-oriented medical record in 1964, but a 1968 article published by the New England Journal of Medicine introduced the concept to a broader audience. In the late 1960s and early 1970s he gave lectures at medical schools around the country, and published a book that described the problem-oriented medical record in more detail. Weed's POMR included two features that have become nearly universal in healthcare, the Problem List and the SOAP note (Subjective, Objective, Assessment, and Plan).

Over 2,000 academic articles and numerous medical textbooks discuss Weed's problem-oriented medical record, and it has become a central component of medical and nursing education. His original idea for a patient problem list was adapted and put into law in the “meaningful use” requirements of the Health Information Technology for Economic and Clinical Health (HITECH) Act, which promoted the adoption of electronic health records in the United States.

He also helped develop PROMIS, a computerized medical information system based on the problem-oriented record, which used a touch screen; introduced in 1969, that system was one of the earliest versions of an electronic medical record. He launched a company PKC, which developed methods for clinical information management systems. In 2012, the firm was purchased by Sharecare.

== Honors ==
Weed was elected a member of the National Academy of Sciences in May 1972 and would later receive the Gustav O. Leinhard Award from the Institute of Medicine for his contribution of the problem-oriented medical record to the field of medicine. He was a founding fellow of the American College of Medical Informatics.

- 1995 Gustav O. Lienhard Award, Institute of Medicine, Washington, D.C.
- 1991 Computers in Healthcare Health Care Pioneer for: Contributions to the development of the healthcare information systems industry.
- 1984 ACMI (American College of Medical Informatics) Founding Fellow.
- 1978 Honorary Fellow of the American Academy of Medical Administrators.
- 1976 Monsour Medical Foundation Teaching Award, Health Education & Media Association.
- 1973 First Brookdale Award in Medicine, AMA National Convention.
- 1972 Elected Member of the National Academy of Sciences.
- 1971 Gerald Lambert Award for Innovation in Health Care.
