= Clinical clerkship =

Internship for prospective doctors

Clinical clerkships encompass a period of medical education in which students – medical, dental, veterinary, nursing or otherwise – practice medicine under the supervision of a health practitioner.

== Medical clerkships ==
In medical education, a clerkship, or rotation, refers to the practice of medicine by medical students (M.D., D.O., D.P.M) during their final year(s) of study. Traditionally, the first half of medical school trains students in the classroom setting, and the second half takes place in a teaching hospital. Clerkships give students experience in all parts of the hospital setting, including the operating room, emergency department, and various other departments that allow learning by viewing and doing.

Students are required to undergo a pre-clerkship course, which include introduction to clinical medicine, clinical skills, and clinical reasoning. A performance assessment such as the Objective Structured Clinical Examination (OSCE) is conducted at the end of this period. During the clerkship training, students are required to rotate through different medical specialties and treat patients under the supervision of physicians. Students elicit patient histories, complete physical examinations, write progress notes, and assist in surgeries and medical procedures. They are also actively involved in the diagnoses and treatment of patients under the supervision of a resident or faculty.

Students undergoing two-year clerkships spend their first year in patient care environment in month-long rotations with limited patient workloads. In their final year, when they are sometimes referred to as sub-interns or externs, they are given more patient care responsibilities in a variety or elective rotations.

The work hours are that of a full-time job, generally similar to that of residents. Students may also be required to work on weekends and to be on call. For medical students, clerkships occur after the basic science curriculum, and are supervised by medical specialists at a teaching hospital or medical school. Typically, certain clerkships are required to obtain the Doctor of Medicine degree or the Doctor of Osteopathic Medicine degree in the United States (e.g., internal medicine, surgery, pediatrics), while others are elective (e.g., dermatology, pathology, and neurology).

The intent of the clinical clerkship is to teach the medical student the fundamentals of clinical examination, evaluation, and care provision, and to enable the student to select the course of further study. Another purpose of the clerkship is for the student to determine if they really want to pursue a career in the field of medicine. During the clinical clerkship, the medical student will interact with real patients much as a physician does, but their evaluation and recommendations will be reviewed and approved by more senior physicians. The expectation is that the students will not only master the knowledge in successfully treating patients but they are also expected to assume the physician's role.

=== United States ===
In the United States, medical school typically lasts four years. Medical students spend the first part of the third and fourth years rotating through a combination of required clerkship and electives. Most medical schools require rotations in internal medicine, surgery, pediatrics, psychiatry, obstetrics and gynecology, family medicine, and neurology. Some schools may additionally require emergency medicine, anesthesiology, radiology, ambulatory medicine, or intensive-care medicine. Furthermore, a common graduation requirement is to complete a sub-internship in a specialty, where the medical student acts as an intern.

=== Australia ===
==== New South Wales ====
In the 2010s, the New South Wales administration partnered with the University of Wollongong to enroll its senior medical students in a year-long integrated experience of longitudinal clinical clerkship. Students were sent in regional, rural or remote areas of the NSW and worked in interprofessional hospitals and community teams in which a supervisor or a review gave them first access to acute and chronic care patients. Active and experiential learning were based on multi-professional general practices, primary health care clinics, hospital emergency, ward-based patient care and concerns of surgery.

Care and supervision had been modelled on the previous Cambridge community-based clinical course and on the Parallel Rural Community Curriculum introduced by South Australia in 2007.

== Nursing and Physician Assistant programs ==
In nursing education, a clerkship refers to the clinical courses conducted by students during their final year of studies. The student satisfaction with the clerkship is a determinant factor in selection of nursing field.

Physician assistant programs in the United States used the term in the same manner.
