= IS PATH WARM? =

Mnemonic device for suicide warning signs

IS PATH WARM? is an acronym utilized as a mnemonic device. It was created by the American Association of Suicidology to help counselors and the general public "remember the warning signs of suicide."

== The acronym ==
| I | Ideation | Talking of wanting to die, looking for ways to die, talking about death |
| S | Substance abuse | Increased or excessive substance use (alcohol or drugs) |
| P | Purposelessness | No reason for living; no sense of purpose in life |
| A | Anxiety | Anxiety, agitation; unable to sleep |
| T | Trapped | Feeling trapped – like there's no way out; resistance to help |
| H | Hopelessness | Hopelessness about the future |
| W | Withdrawal | Withdrawing from friends, family and society; sleeping all the time |
| A | Anger | Rage, uncontrolled anger; seeking revenge |
| R | Recklessness | Acting recklessly or engaging in risky activities, seemingly without thinking |
| M | Mood changes | Dramatic mood changes |

== Predictive value ==
Reviews from the psychiatric literature regarding the "IS PATH WARM" mnemonic have been mixed. Several studies have confirmed that some of the acronym's warning signs are associated with suicidal ideation. A study compared 215 postings on an online "suicide forum" with 94 postings on a "self-injury forum". They found that posters in the 'suicide forum' were more likely than those in the 'self-injury forum' to express suicidal ideation, purposelessness, feeling trapped, and social withdrawal. (However, they were less likely than those in the self-injury forum to express recklessness.) The study concluded that individuals who exhibit "IS PATH WARM" warning signs were more likely to have suicidal ideation.

However, the psychiatric literature has been critical of the "IS PATH WARM" mnemonic's value in predicting suicidal behavior. A white paper prepared for the United States Fire Service's Suicide and Depression Summit stated that the acronym's "utility has been hampered by both limited sensitivity and weak specificity." A 2011 study was also critical of "IS PATH WARM"'s validity, finding that none of the ten warning signs were able to predict completed suicides.

According to a review of school-based suicide prevention, an additional concern is that the IS PATH WARM warning signs were based on risk factors for suicide that appear across the lifespan. Having not been evaluated independently for youth, the author writes, the acronym's value in predicting suicidal behavior in children is uncertain.

== Educational value ==
In creating the "IS PATH WARM" mnemonic, one of the American Association of Suicidology's stated goals was to aid the general public in learning and recalling the warning signs of suicide. The Society's "IS PATH WARM" webpage explains: "These warning signs were compiled by a task force of expert clinical-researchers and 'translated' for the general public."

As an educational tool, "IS PATH WARM" has received widespread exposure. For example, it has been disseminated in suicide prevention materials from such diverse sources as the Substance Abuse and Mental Health Services Administration's National Suicide Prevention Lifeline; the Canadian Association for Suicide Prevention; the New York State Department of Correctional Services Training Academy; and the United States Navy, among many others.

Research regarding whether the mnemonic achieves its educational goals has been limited. However, a 2009 study compared two groups of airmen participating in the United States Air Force Suicide Prevention Program (AFSPP). One group received the Program's standard briefing, which did not include "IS PATH WARM", while the other received the standard briefing along with information about the mnemonic. The researchers concluded:

Participants in the standard briefing significantly increased their ability to list suicide warning signs and improved consistency with an expert consensus list, whereas participants in the standard briefing plus mnemonic demonstrated no learning. ... Results suggest that inclusion of the mnemonic in the AFSPP briefing interfered with participants' ability to learn suicide warning signs, and that increased confidence in the perceived ability to recognize suicide risk is not related to actual ability to accurately recall warning signs.

In summary, the limited research available regarding the educational utility of the "IS PATH WARM" mnemonic shows a negative impact on ability to recognize warning signs for suicide, combined with a mistaken sense of confidence in one's ability to do so.

== See also ==
- Assessment of suicide risk
- Beck Hopelessness Scale
- SAD PERSONS scale
