= CASMEET =

CASMEET is a mnemonic acronym used by emergency medical services to communicate the important details of a patient over to an emergency control centre, receiving hospital, or other definitive care provider. A CASMEET message can be sent in order to pre-alert a receiving emergency department that a critically ill patient is being brought in. It can be used as an alternative to ASHICE.

== Meaning of the acronym ==
The acronym is used to pass all the most vital details of the patient to the receiving hospital in order to ensure staff have all the appropriate equipment and staff assembled and prepared.

- Callsign of the vehicle/unit responding
- Age — patient's age
- Sex — whether the patient is male or female
- Mechanism/Mode — the mechanism of injury or the mode of illness
- Examination — the clinical findings from the initial assessment of the patient
- ETA — estimated time of arrival
- Treatment — any treatment that has already been provided

== Other uses ==
CASMEET can also be used when handing over a patient from one level of pre-hospital care to another -- for example, from first responder to paramedic.
