= Growth landmarks =

Growth landmarks are parameters measured in infants, children and adolescents which help gauge where they are on a continuum of normal growth and development.

Growth landmarks have also been used for determination of abnormal growth as well.
