= AEIOU-TIPS =

Mnemonic acronym used by some medical professionals

AEIOU-TIPS is a mnemonic acronym used by some medical professionals to recall the possible causes for altered mental status. Medical literature discusses its utility in determining differential diagnoses in various special populations presenting with altered mental status including infants, children, adolescents, and the elderly. The mnemonic also frequently appears in textbooks and reference books regarding emergency medicine in a variety of settings, from the emergency department and standard emergency medical services to wilderness medicine.

== The acronym ==
	Component(s) of acronym	Examples
A	Alcohol/Abuse of substances Acidosis	Alcohol or drug intoxication Diabetic ketoacidosis; Respiratory acidosis due to CO2 narcosia hypoventilation due to COPD, asthmatic airway obstruction, or neuromuscular disease
E	Ecstasy Environmental; Epilepsy; Electrolytes; Encephalopathy; Endocrine disease	Hypothermia; hyperthermia Epileptic seizure (or seizure for any other reason); Hyponatremia; hypernatremia; hypocalcemia; hypercalcemia Wernicke's encephalopathy; Chronic traumatic encephalopathy (CTE); Adrenal insufficiency; thyroid disease
I	Infection	Encephalitis, meningitis, meningoencephalitis; sepsis
O	Overdose; Oxygen deficiency	Prescription or non-prescription drug overdose Hypoxia due to pulmonary edema, pulmonary embolism or tension pneumothorax; hypoxic brain injury due to cardiac arrest
U	Underdose; Uremia	Insufficient dose of prescription medications Excess urea in the blood due to kidney failure, congestive heart failure, urinary obstruction
T	Trauma; Tumor	Concussion; traumatic brain injury; increased intracranial pressure due to epidural hemorrhage Brain tumor; metastasis to the brain; paraneoplastic syndrome
I	Insulin; Intestinal	Hypoglycemia; hyperosmolar hyperglycemic state Intussusception; Intestinal malrotation with volvulus
P	Psychogenic; Poisons	Psychosis; pseudoseizure; conversion disorder Carbon monoxide poisoning; lead poisoning; iron poisoning
S	Stroke; Shock	Hemorrhagic stroke due to arteriovenous malformation (AVM); Neurogenic shock due to spinal cord injury; cardiogenic shock due to myocardial infarction
