= SAMPLE history =

Mnemonic acronym in emergency medicine

SAMPLE history is a mnemonic acronym to remember key questions for a person's medical assessment. The SAMPLE history is sometimes used in conjunction with vital signs and OPQRST. The questions are most commonly used in the field of emergency medicine by first responders during the secondary assessment. It is used for alert (conscious) people, but often much of this information can also be obtained from the family or friend of an unresponsive person. In the case of severe trauma, this portion of the assessment is less important. A derivative of SAMPLE history is AMPLE history, which places a greater emphasis on a person's medical history.

== Meaning ==
The parts of the mnemonic are:

- S – Signs/Symptoms (Symptoms are important but they are subjective.)
- A – Allergies
- M – Medications
- P – Past Pertinent medical history
- L – Last Oral Intake (Sometimes also Last Menstrual Cycle and/or Last Visit to a Health Care Practitioner, not including pertinent reasons such as past pertinent medical history)
- E – Events Leading Up To Present Illness / Injury

== See also ==
- OPQRST
- ABC (medicine)
- Past Medical History
