= RNCHAMPS =

Medical mnemonic for types of shock

RNCHAMPS (pronounced "R, N, champs") is a mnemonic acronym used to recall the types of shock. The mnemonic is alternately known as CRAMPS NH ("Cramps, New Hampshire") or NH-CRAMPS ("New Hampshire cramps"). Its utility in distinguishing types of shock has been discussed in medical literature and reference material concerning emergency medicine, emergency medical services, fire rescue, and specialized courses such as the Comprehensive Advanced Life Support Program.

== The acronym ==
	Component of acronym	Examples: Traumatic Causes	Examples: Medical Causes
R	Respiratory	Flail chest; tension pneumothorax; pleural effusion	Hypoxemia due to COPD, asthma, pulmonary edema
N	Neurogenic	Traumatic brain injury; cervical or high thoracic spinal cord injury	
C	Cardiogenic	Cardiac tamponade; tension pneumothorax; pulmonary embolism	Left ventricular myocardial infarction; cardiomyopathy; bradydysrhythmias
H	Hypovolemic	Hemorrhage; burns (due to third spacing)	Dehydration; diarrheal diseases; aortic aneurysm
A	Anaphylactic		Anaphylaxis
M	Metabolic	Hypoventilation due to traumatic brain injury or tension pneumothorax	Diabetic ketoacidosis; hypoventilation due to COPD, asthma, or severe pneumonia
P	Psychogenic		Sudden emotional stimulus, i.e. terror, elation, or surprise
S	Septic	Osteomyelitis; infections secondary to burns	Meningitis; bacteremia; pyelonephritis; upper respiratory infection

== Alternatives ==
The Comprehensive Advanced Life Support (CALS) Program uses a slightly different acronym called "SHRIMPCAN." This acronym adds the letter "I", which stands for "Ingestions" (drug overdoses). The remainder of the letters in the acronym stand for the same components as the RNCHAMPS mnemonic.
