= Progress note =

Progress notes are the part of a medical record where healthcare professionals record details to document a patient's clinical status or achievements during the course of a hospitalization or over the course of outpatient care. Reassessment data may be recorded in the Progress Notes, Master Treatment Plan (MTP) and/or MTP review. Progress notes are written in a variety of formats and detail, depending on the clinical situation at hand and the information the clinician wishes to record. One example is the SOAP note, where the note is organized into Subjective, Objective, Assessment, and Plan sections. Another example is the DART system, organized into Description, Assessment, Response, and Treatment. Documentation of care and treatment is an extremely important part of the treatment process. Progress notes are written by both physicians and nurses to document patient care on a regular interval during a patient's hospitalization.

Progress notes serve as a record of events during a patient's care, allow clinicians to compare past status to current status, serve to communicate findings, opinions and plans between physicians and other members of the medical care team, and allow retrospective review of case details for a variety of interested parties. They are the repository of medical facts and clinical thinking, and are intended to be a concise vehicle of communication about a patient’s condition to those who access the health record. The majority of the medical record consists of progress notes documenting the care delivered and the clinical events relevant to diagnosis and treatment for a patient. They should be readable, easily understood, complete, accurate, and concise. They must also be flexible enough to logically convey to others what happened during an encounter, e.g., the chain of events during the visit, as well as guaranteeing full accountability for documented material, e.g., who recorded the information and when it was recorded.
