= SAD PERSONS scale =

Clinical assessment tool for suicide risk

- Purpose: determine suicide risk

The SAD PERSONS scale is an acronym utilized as a mnemonic device. It was first developed as a clinical assessment tool for medical professionals to determine suicide risk, by Patterson et al. The Adapted-SAD PERSONS Scale was developed by Gerald A. Juhnke for use with children in 1996.

Recent studies have found although the scale has specificity, its sensitivity is so low it is of no clinical value; moreover it may actually be clinically harmful. This measure has also been criticized for being an index of risk factors that may not be applicable to individuals, and that suicide risk be assessed with more valid measures of the individual's current risk level.

== Calculation ==
The score is calculated from ten yes/no questions, with one point for each affirmative answer:

- S: Male sex
- A: Age (<19 or >45 years)
- D: Depression
- P: Previous attempt
- E: Excess alcohol or substance use
- R: Rational thinking loss
- S: Social supports lacking
- O: Organized plan
- N: No spouse
- S: Sickness

This score is then mapped onto a risk assessment scale as follows:

- 0–4: Low
- 5–6: Medium
- 7–10: High

== Modified SAD PERSONS Scale ==
The score is calculated from ten yes/no questions, with points given for each affirmative answer as follows:

- S: Male sex → 1
- A: Age 15–25 or 59+ years → 1
- D: Depression or hopelessness → 2
- P: Previous suicidal attempts or psychiatric care → 1
- E: Excessive ethanol or drug use → 1
- R: Rational thinking loss (psychotic or organic illness) → 2
- S: Single, widowed or divorced → 1
- O: Organized or serious attempt → 2
- N: No social support → 1
- S: Stated future intent (determined to repeat or ambivalent) → 2

This score is then mapped onto a risk assessment scale as follows:

- 0–5: May be safe to discharge (depending upon circumstances)
- 6–8: Probably requires psychiatric consultation
- >8: Probably requires hospital admission

== See also ==
- Assessment of suicide risk
- Beck Hopelessness Scale
- Is Path Warm?
- Suicide
