= Operative report =

An operative report is a report written in a patient's medical record to document the details of a surgery. The operative report is dictated right after a surgical procedure and later transcribed into the patient's record. The operative report includes preoperative and postoperative diagnoses, patient condition after surgery, all medications used in association with the procedure, pertinent medical history (Hx), physical examination (PE), consent forms, surgeon′s orders, and identifies the anesthetist and anesthesia used.

The report is used by healthcare professionals immediately attending the patient's postoperative recovery, and as the primary basis for reimbursement claims by the surgeon, surgical team, and medical facility. The patient, too, is entitled to the report, and other medical records, by the laws of most American states, and many other jurisdictions.

Operative report standards are set by the Accreditation Association for Ambulatory Health Care (AAAHC) and the Joint Commission on Accreditation of Healthcare Organizations (JCAHO).
