= ASHICE =

ASHICE is one of several mnemonic acronyms used by emergency medical services in the United Kingdom and Ireland to pass summarised advance details of a patient to the next group of persons or organisation dealing with them, otherwise known as a "Pre-Alert" other pre-alert acronyms include 'ATMIST' and 'CASMEET'. In the English and Welsh NHSs, the procedure is not used for non-critical patients on their eventual journey to hospital but is used as standard procedure for handovers of patients before transport to hospital where a site or event is staffed by trained personnel of both paid or voluntary ambulance services. This procedure is in addition to written records of the patient's personal and medical details and any treatment or medication applied prior to transport to the hospital.

The word is treated as a noun by personnel (whether first aiders, community first responders or paramedics) who might refer to e.g. 'passing an ASHICE'. The purpose of an ASHICE message is to enable persons involved in the next stage of treatment to make an advance determination of the appropriate personnel and facilities to deal with a patient and the degree of urgency to be applied.

== Meaning of the acronym ==
The acronym is used to pass all the most vital details of the patient to the receiving hospital in order to ensure staff have all the appropriate equipment and staff assembled and prepared.

- Age — Patient's age
- Sex — Whether the patient is male or female
- History — The immediate cause of injury or description of illness and any relevant preceding factors such as medical history and medicines taken or not taken
- Injuries/Illness — What injuries have been sustained, or what illness symptoms are presenting
- Condition — Observations of the patient (pulse, BP etc.), interventions used (cannulation, intubation etc.)
- ETA - Estimated Time of Arrival at the receiving hospital

In the British Red Cross and St John Ambulance, the same acronym is used by First-Aiders in the stages between initial contact and handover (if any) to ambulance crew but the last letter is trained as 'Everything Else'
