= SOCRATES (pain assessment) =

Mnemonic acronym for pain evaluation

SOCRATES is a mnemonic acronym used by emergency medical services, physicians, nurses, and other health professionals to evaluate the nature of pain that a patient is experiencing.

== Uses ==
SOCRATES is used to gain an insight into the patient's condition, and to allow the health care provider to develop a plan for dealing with it. It can be useful for differentiating between nociceptive pain and neuropathic pain.

== Adverse effects ==
SOCRATES only focuses on the physical effects of pain, and ignores the social and emotional effects of pain.

== Procedure ==
SOCRATES
Letter	Aspect	Example Questions
S	Site	Where is the pain? Or the maximal site of the pain.
O	Onset	When did the pain start, and was it sudden or gradual? Include also whether it is progressive or regressive.
C	Character	What is the pain like? An ache? Stabbing?
R	Radiation	Does the pain radiate anywhere?
A	Associations	Any other signs or symptoms associated with the pain?
T	Time course	Does the pain follow any pattern?
E	Exacerbating / relieving factors	Does anything change the pain?
S	Severity	How bad is the pain?

== History ==
SOCRATES is often poorly used by health care providers. Although pain assessments usually cover many or most of the aspects, they rarely included all 8 aspects.

== See also ==
- History of presenting complaint
- Medical history
- OPQRST
