= OPQRST =

Mnemonic initialism for acute conditions

OPQRST is a mnemonic initialism used by medical professionals to accurately discern reasons for a patient's symptoms and history in the event of an acute illness. It is specifically adapted to elicit symptoms of a possible heart attack. Each letter stands for an important line of questioning for the patient assessment. This is usually taken along with vital signs and the SAMPLE history and would usually be recorded by the person delivering the aid, such as in the "Subjective" portion of a SOAP note, for later reference.

"PQRST" (onset "O") is sometimes used in conjunction.

The term "OPQRST-AAA" adds "aggravating/alleviating factors", "associated symptoms", and "attributions/adaptations".

== Use ==
The parts of the mnemonic are:

Onset of the event
What the patient was doing when it started (active, inactive, stressed, etc.), whether the patient believes that activity prompted the pain, and whether the onset was sudden, gradual or part of an ongoing chronic problem.
Provocation or palliation
Whether any movement, pressure (such as palpation) or other external factor makes the problem better or worse. This can also include whether the symptoms relieve with rest.
Quality of the pain
This is the patient's description of the pain. Questions can be open ended ("Can you describe it for me?") or leading. Ideally, this will elicit descriptions of the patient's pain: whether it is sharp, dull, crushing, burning, tearing, or some other feeling, along with the pattern, such as intermittent, constant, or throbbing.
Region and radiation
Where the pain is on the body and whether it radiates (extends) or moves to any other area. This can give indications for conditions such as a myocardial infarction, which can radiate through the jaw and arms. Other referred pains can provide clues to underlying medical causes.
Severity
The pain score (usually on a scale of 0 to 10). Zero is no pain and ten is the worst possible pain. This can be comparative (such as "... compared to the worst pain you have ever experienced") or imaginative ("... compared to having your arm ripped off by an alien"). If the pain is compared to a prior event, the nature of that event may be a follow-up question. The clinician must decide whether a score given is realistic within their experience – for instance, a pain score 10 for a stubbed toe is likely to be exaggerated. This may also be assessed for pain now, compared to pain at time of onset, or pain on movement. There are alternative assessment methods for pain, which can be used where a patient is unable to vocalise a score. One such method is the Wong-Baker faces pain scale.
Time (history)
How long the condition has been going on and how it has changed since onset (better, worse, different symptoms), whether it has ever happened before, whether and how it may have changed since onset, and when the pain stopped if it is no longer currently being felt.

== See also ==
- History of the present illness
- SAMPLE history
- SOCRATES (pain assessment)
