= Health assessment =

Individual test and history examination

A health assessment is a plan of care that identifies the specific needs of a person and how those needs will be addressed by the healthcare system or skilled nursing facility. Health assessment is the evaluation of the health status by performing a physical exam after taking a health history. It is done to detect diseases early in people that may look and feel well.

Evidence does not support routine health assessments in otherwise healthy people.

Health assessment is the evaluation of the health status of an individual along the health continuum. The purpose of the assessment is to establish where on the health continuum the individual is because this guides how to approach and treat the individual. The health care approaches range from preventive, to treatment, to palliative care in relation to the individual's status on the health continuum. It is not the treatment or treatment plan. The plan related to findings is a care plan which is preceded by the specialty such as medical, physical therapy, nursing, etc.

== Corporate health assessments ==
Research by Data Bridge Market Research shows that the market for corporate health assessments which was USD 2,91,272.4 million in 2023, is likely to reach USD 8,23,374.65million by 2031 and is expected to undergo a CAGR of 12.5% during the forecast period.

Healthcare providers such as Bupa and Nuffield now routinely offer health assessments to individuals and corporate clients, building on the growing market for these services.

Definitions of health assessment are varied, with some using the term health assessment and health checks interchangeably.

UK healthcare provider Verve Healthcare makes a clear difference:

- A staff health check is a routine examination conducted by a health professional to assess an individual's overall health status. The primary aim is to identify health issues early, to monitor ongoing health conditions and to monitor future health risks.
- Health assessments are more detailed than regular health checks. They provide a holistic view of an individual's health and can identify underlying health conditions.

== History ==
Health assessment has been separated by authors from physical assessment to include the focus on health occurring on a continuum as a fundamental teaching. In the healthcare industry it is understood health occurs on a continuum, so the term used is assessment but may be preference by the speciality's focus such as nursing, physical therapy, etc. In healthcare, the assessment's focus is biopsychosocial but the intensity of focus may vary by the type of healthcare practitioner. For example, in the emergency room the focus is chief complaint and how to help that person related to the perceived problem. If the problem is a heart attack then the intensity of focus is on the biological/physical problem initially.

== See also ==
- Nursing assessment
